= Armorial of Polish nobility =

Polish heraldry is a distinct system characteristic of the Polish nobility (szlachta). It originated from the medieval clans of knights and warriors who provided military service to the monarch or regional dukes. Unlike many Western European heraldic traditions, where a coat of arms is usually tied to a single family line, the Polish system is built upon the heraldic clan.

With few exceptions, all families belonging to the same heraldic clan bear an identical coat of arms. In the Polish language, the term herb refers simultaneously to the heraldic device itself and the corporate identity of the clan. This collective ownership meant that hundreds of families, often with different surnames and residing in disparate regions, could share the same armorial bearings and clan name.

== Polish heraldry ==
A Polish heraldic clan historically comprised individuals sharing common heraldic traditions, though its precise definition remains a subject of academic debate. Unlike the Scottish clan system, which is typically defined by territoriality and direct consanguinity, the Polish ród is often characterized by historians as a "knightly fraternity" or a military union of knights (brotherhood).

Under this system, numerous distinct and often unrelated families belonged to the same clan, granting them the collective right to use a single coat of arms. Historiographical debate persists regarding whether the origins of these clans were rooted in genuine kinship or evolved from artificial social structures. This distinction is central to understanding the historical development of the Polish nobility and the legal foundations of their privileged social status.

In the year 1244, Bolesław, Duke of Masovia, identified members of the knights' clan as members of a genealogia:

"I received my good servitors [Raciborz and Albert] from the land of [Great] Poland, and from the clan [genealogia] called Jelito, with my well-disposed knowledge [i.e., consent and encouragement] and the cry [vocitatio], [that is], the godło, [by the name of] Nagody, and I established them in the said land of mine, Masovia, [on the military tenure described elsewhere in the charter]."

The earliest surviving documentation of Polish clan names and battle cries as markers of knightly status dates to the tenure of Raciborz and Albert in the mid-13th century. These names and cries functioned to ritualize the ius militare (the right to command an army) and were used to define noble status prior to 1244.

While these oral traditions were established early, the association of specific knightly genealogiae (lineages) with physical heraldic devices did not occur until later in the Middle Ages and into the early modern period. Unlike Western European heraldry, Polish coats of arms possess individual names, typically derived from the original battle cry or the imagery depicted on the shield.

Although attachment to a clan lineage remained a significant aspect of the Polish noble consciousness, its role from the 17th to the 20th century was largely ceremonial and symbolic. In daily life, the sense of belonging to a specific family house typically predominated over clan affiliation. This distinction is evidenced by the organization of most Polish armorials, which are generally arranged by family name rather than by heraldic device.

=== Heraldic fragmentation ===
The social and legal standing of the Polish nobility underwent significant changes during the Partitions of Poland. Under the administration of the partitioning powers (Russia, Prussia, and Austria), the nobility were required to provide formal proof of their status to imperial heraldry offices.

Among the poorer nobility, the process of legitimation often led to the accidental or deliberate misidentification of ancestral arms. Consequently, branches of the same family were occasionally registered under different coats of arms.

During this era, magnate families and some landowners sought and obtained titles of nobility such as prince, count, or baron from foreign monarchs, the French Empire, or the Papacy. These titles were often accompanied by augmentation of the family's original coat of arms.

== List ==
This is a list of the coats of arms of Polish heraldic clans by their most common names.

=== A ===
- Abdank coat of arms
- Abdank II coat of arms
- Abgarowicz coat of arms
- Abrahamowicz coat of arms
- Abrahamowicz II coat of arms
- Abrahimowicz coat of arms
- Abramowicz coat of arms
- Abstagen coat of arms
- Achinger coat of arms
- Achinger II coat of arms
- Achinger III coat of arms
- Achmat coat of arms
- Achmetowicz coat of arms
- Adamowicz coat of arms
- Adamowicz II coat of arms
- Adamowicz III coat of arms
- Adamowicz IV coat of arms
- Adeling coat of arms
- Aderkas coat of arms
- Adler coat of arms
- Agryppa coat of arms
- Ajsicz coat of arms
- Aksak coat of arms
- Aksak II coat of arms
- Aksak III coat of arms
- Alabanda coat of arms
- Alabis coat of arms
- Alan coat of arms
- Alant coat of arms
- Albecki coat of arms
- Albedyl coat of arms
- Albergatti coat of arms
- Albertrandi coat of arms
- Albijewicz coat of arms
- Albiński coat of arms
- Albrich coat of arms
- Alchimowicz coat of arms
- Alejewicz coat of arms
- Aleksander Pan coat of arms
- Aleksandrowicz coat of arms
- Aleksandrowicz II coat of arms
- Aleksandrowicz III coat of arms
- Alemani coat of arms
- Alkiewicz coat of arms
- Allan coat of arms
- Alopeus coat of arms
- Aloy coat of arms
- Altexwange coat of arms
- Amadej coat of arms
- Amandi coat of arms
- Amboten coat of arms
- Ambros coat of arms
- Ambrożewicz coat of arms
- Amirowicz coat of arms
- Ancuta coat of arms
- Anderson coat of arms
- Andrault coat of arms
- Andrault de Buy coat of arms
- Andrejowicz coat of arms
- Andronowski coat of arms
- Androszewski coat of arms
- Andruski coat of arms
- Andruszkiewicz coat of arms
- Andrychewicz coat of arms
- Andrychowicz coat of arms
- Andrzejewicz coat of arms
- Andrzejewski coat of arms
- Andrzejkowicz coat of arms
- Andrzejowski coat of arms
- Andrzejowski II coat of arms
- Anhalt-Köthen coat of arms
- Ankwicz coat of arms
- Ankwicz coat of arms
- Ankwicz II coat of arms
- Anrep coat of arms
- Antici coat of arms
- Antoniewicz coat of arms
- Anzelieri coat of arms
- Apraksin coat of arms
- Araż coat of arms
- Arcemberski coat of arms
- Arcemberski II coat of arms
- Arcopaeus coat of arms
- Arłamowski coat of arms
- Arnold coat of arms
- Arquien coat of arms
- Arquien de la Grange coat of arms
- Arsłan coat of arms
- Arszeniewski coat of arms
- Arumowicz coat of arms
- Asch coat of arms
- Assanczuk coat of arms
- Assanowicz coat of arms
- Assanowicz II coat of arms
- Aster coat of arms
- Attinencjusz coat of arms
- Auer coat of arms
- Augustynowicz coat of arms
- Aulok coat of arms
- Aurszwald coat of arms
- Aweyde coat of arms
- Awstacz coat of arms
- Axt coat of arms
- Azulewicz coat of arms

=== B ===
- Babel coat of arms
- Babiński coat of arms
- Bacciarelli coat of arms
- Baczewski coat of arms
- Baczyński coat of arms
- Badeni coat of arms
- Baecker coat of arms
- Bagiński coat of arms
- Bagniewski coat of arms
- Bajbuza coat of arms
- Bajer coat of arms
- Bajerski coat of arms
- Baka coat of arms
- Bakałowicz coat of arms
- Bakurynski coat of arms
- Balcerowicz coat of arms
- Baliats coat of arms
- Baluze coat of arms
- Bałaban coat of arms
- Bałga coat of arms
- Bałła coat of arms
- Bandemer coat of arms
- Bandinelli coat of arms
- Bańkowski coat of arms
- Bar coat of arms
- Barana Rogi coat of arms
- Baraniaglowa coat of arms
- Baranowicz coat of arms
- Baranowski coat of arms
- Barberiusz coat of arms
- Barczeski coat of arms
- Barczewski coat of arms
- Bardach coat of arms
- Bardeleben coat of arms
- Bargański coat of arms
- Bartkowski coat of arms
- Bartlinski coat of arms
- Bartoloni coat of arms
- Bartsch coat of arms
- Bartsch II coat of arms
- Bartsch III coat of arms
- Bartynowski coat of arms
- Baruth coat of arms
- Barwik coat of arms
- Barwiński coat of arms
- Baryczka coat of arms
- Barzta coat of arms
- Bastian coat of arms
- Bastion coat of arms
- Batowski coat of arms
- Baudouin coat of arms
- Baudouin de Courtenay coat of arms
- Baum coat of arms
- Baum coat of arms
- Baum II coat of arms
- Baumgart coat of arms
- Baumgarten coat of arms
- Bawola coat of arms
- Bawola Głowa coat of arms
- Baworowski coat of arms
- Baworowski coat of arms
- Baworowski II coat of arms
- Bawół coat of arms
- Bawół II coat of arms
- Bazarewicz coat of arms
- Bazarowicz coat of arms
- Bazylewicz coat of arms
- Bazylik coat of arms
- Bażeński coat of arms
- Bażeński II coat of arms
- Bażeński III coat of arms
- Bąkowski coat of arms
- Bąkowski II coat of arms
- Bebrykowicz coat of arms
- Becker coat of arms
- Becz coat of arms
- Becze coat of arms
- Beczka coat of arms
- Bedlewicz coat of arms
- Bedlewicz II coat of arms
- Beduta coat of arms
- Behem coat of arms
- Behem II coat of arms
- Bejnart coat of arms
- Bejnart II coat of arms
- Bejnart III coat of arms
- Bejszer coat of arms
- Bekaw coat of arms
- Beke coat of arms
- Bekesz coat of arms
- Bekiesz coat of arms
- Bekler coat of arms
- Belgram coat of arms
- Belina coat of arms
- Belza II coat of arms
- Bełdowski coat of arms
- Bełty coat of arms
- Bełty II coat of arms
- Bełza coat of arms
- Bem coat of arms
- Benisz coat of arms
- Benkin coat of arms
- Bensa coat of arms
- Ber coat of arms
- Berendej coat of arms
- Berens coat of arms
- Bereśniewicz coat of arms
- Berg coat of arms
- Berg II coat of arms
- Berge coat of arms
- Bergman coat of arms
- Bergonzoni coat of arms
- Berkler coat of arms
- Berkowicz coat of arms
- Bernatowicz coat of arms
- Bernatowicz II coat of arms
- Bernatowicz III coat of arms
- Bernatowicz IV coat of arms
- Bernatowicz-Gieysztoff coat of arms
- Berneaux de Picardi coat of arms
- Bernefour coat of arms
- Bernhard coat of arms
- Bernowicz coat of arms
- Bernsdorf coat of arms
- Bersin coat of arms
- Berszten coat of arms
- Berszten II coat of arms
- Bertrand coat of arms
- Bertrand de Dombales coat of arms
- Berżewicz coat of arms
- Bes coat of arms
- Bessler coat of arms
- Bestwinski coat of arms
- Betkowski coat of arms
- Betman coat of arms
- Beyzym coat of arms
- Bezpalij coat of arms
- Beztrwogi coat of arms
- Będkowski coat of arms
- Będziński coat of arms
- Biała coat of arms
- Białachowski coat of arms
- Białęga coat of arms
- Białk coat of arms
- Białobłocki coat of arms
- Białobłocki II coat of arms
- Białogłowski coat of arms
- Białokurowicz coat of arms
- Białopiór coat of arms
- Białoskórski coat of arms
- Białoskrzydł coat of arms
- Białostocki coat of arms
- Białozór coat of arms
- Białucki coat of arms
- Biały Zawój coat of arms
- Białynia coat of arms
- Białynia II coat of arms
- Bianki coat of arms
- Biderman coat of arms
- Biberstein coat of arms
- Biberski coat of arms
- Biegaczewicz coat of arms
- Biel coat of arms
- Bielak coat of arms
- Bielański coat of arms
- Bielawa coat of arms
- Bielawski coat of arms
- Bielikowicz coat of arms
- Bieliny coat of arms
- Bieliński coat of arms
- Bieliński II coat of arms
- Bieliński III coat of arms
- Bielski coat of arms
- Bielski coat of arms
- Bielski II coat of arms
- Bielski III coat of arms
- Bielski IV coat of arms
- Biełosielski coat of arms
- Biełosielski-Biełozierski coat of arms
- Bienicki coat of arms
- Bieniewiec coat of arms
- Bieńkowski coat of arms
- Bieńkuński coat of arms
- Biją w Łeb coat of arms
- Bildziuk coat of arms
- Biliński coat of arms
- Bilterlink coat of arms
- Biłostocki coat of arms
- Birkut coat of arms
- Birula coat of arms
- Biskupiec coat of arms
- Biszpink coat of arms
- Biwojno coat of arms
- Blacha coat of arms
- Blacha II coat of arms
- Blank coat of arms
- Blankensztein coat of arms
- Blaszkiewicz coat of arms
- Blazewski coat of arms
- Bledowski coat of arms
- Bloch coat of arms
- Block coat of arms
- Blomberg coat of arms
- Blum coat of arms
- Blumstein coat of arms
- Błażowski coat of arms
- Błeszczyński coat of arms
- Błeszyński coat of arms
- Błyszczanowicz coat of arms
- Bniński coat of arms
- Boberfeld coat of arms
- Bobinski coat of arms
- Bobiński-Dekaloga coat of arms
- Boblitz coat of arms
- Bobowski coat of arms
- Bobrowski coat of arms
- Bochdanowicz coat of arms
- Bochen coat of arms
- Bochen II coat of arms
- Bocheński coat of arms
- Bocheński II coat of arms
- Bociarski coat of arms
- Bock coat of arms
- Bock II coat of arms
- Bodek coat of arms
- Bodziec coat of arms
- Bodziec II coat of arms
- Boessner coat of arms
- Boetticher coat of arms
- Bogaty coat of arms
- Bogdan coat of arms
- Bogdanowicz coat of arms
- Bogdanowicz II coat of arms
- Bogorajski coat of arms
- Bogoria coat of arms
- Bogoria II coat of arms
- Bogorya coat of arms
- Bogorya II coat of arms
- Boguchwał coat of arms
- Bogusz coat of arms
- Bohdanowicz coat of arms
- Bohusz coat of arms
- Bohuszewicz coat of arms
- Bojan coat of arms
- Bojarski coat of arms
- Bojcza coat of arms
- Bojomir coat of arms
- Bokij coat of arms
- Bokum coat of arms
- Bokum II coat of arms
- Bolesławski coat of arms
- Bolesławski II coat of arms
- Bolewski coat of arms
- Boll coat of arms
- Bollo coat of arms
- Boloz coat of arms
- Bolszewski coat of arms
- Boltz coat of arms
- Bombek coat of arms
- Bombek II coat of arms
- Bonarowa coat of arms
- Bonelli coat of arms
- Boner coat of arms
- Boniaszewicz coat of arms
- Bonin coat of arms
- Bonin II coat of arms
- Bontani coat of arms
- Bontemps coat of arms
- Bończa coat of arms
- Bończa II coat of arms
- Bończa III coat of arms
- Boratini coat of arms
- Borawski coat of arms
- Borch II coat of arms
- Borch III coat of arms
- Borck coat of arms
- Borejko coat of arms
- Borek coat of arms
- Borek coat of arms
- Borek II coat of arms
- Borek III coat of arms
- Borek IV coat of arms
- Boretti coat of arms
- Boreyko coat of arms
- Borissowe coat of arms
- Borkiewicz coat of arms
- Borkowski coat of arms
- Borkowski II coat of arms
- Borkowski III coat of arms
- Borkowski IV coat of arms
- Borkowski V coat of arms
- Borkowski VI coat of arms
- Borkowski-Dunin coat of arms
- Bormann coat of arms
- Borna coat of arms
- Borna II coat of arms
- Borna III coat of arms
- Borowiec coat of arms
- Borowski coat of arms
- Borowski coat of arms
- Borowski II coat of arms
- Borowski III coat of arms
- Borowski IV coat of arms
- Borozdna coat of arms
- Borski coat of arms
- Borski II coat of arms
- Borski III coat of arms
- Borsnicz coat of arms
- Borstel coat of arms
- Bortkowicz coat of arms
- Boryszowe coat of arms
- Borzestowski coat of arms
- Borzyszkowski coat of arms
- Borzyszkowski III coat of arms
- Borzyszkowski IV coat of arms
- Bosak coat of arms
- Boscamp coat of arms
- Bostowicki coat of arms
- Bouffal coat of arms
- Bożawola coat of arms
- Bożena coat of arms
- Bożeniec coat of arms
- Bożezdarz coat of arms
- Bożydar coat of arms
- Bóbr coat of arms
- Bóbr II coat of arms
- Brackel coat of arms
- Bradacice coat of arms
- Brama coat of arms
- Brandstetter coat of arms
- Brandys coat of arms
- Brandys II coat of arms
- Branicki coat of arms
- Brant coat of arms
- Brant II coat of arms
- Bratkowski coat of arms
- Bratkowski II coat of arms
- Braunek coat of arms
- Brelen coat of arms
- Bremer coat of arms
- Breuer coat of arms
- Breza coat of arms
- Breza II coat of arms
- Breza III coat of arms
- Brezany coat of arms
- Brignole coat of arms
- Brinken coat of arms
- Brisinowski coat of arms
- Brochwicz coat of arms
- Brochwicz II coat of arms
- Brochwicz III coat of arms
- Brochwicz IIIa coat of arms
- Brochwicz IV coat of arms
- Brocki coat of arms
- Brodowicz coat of arms
- Brodowski coat of arms
- Brodowski II coat of arms
- Brodzic coat of arms
- Brodzic II coat of arms
- Brodzic III coat of arms
- Bronic coat of arms
- Bronic II coat of arms
- Broniec coat of arms
- Bronikowski coat of arms
- Bronikowski II coat of arms
- Bronisław coat of arms
- Bronisz coat of arms
- Bronk coat of arms
- Brozek coat of arms
- Bruchanski coat of arms
- Brudne Misy coat of arms
- Bruhl coat of arms
- Brunetti coat of arms
- Brunn coat of arms
- Brunnow coat of arms
- Brunnow II coat of arms
- Brunstein coat of arms
- Brunszwicki coat of arms
- Bruthi coat of arms
- Brychta coat of arms
- Brychta II coat of arms
- Brzezicki coat of arms
- Brzeziński coat of arms
- Brzeziński II coat of arms
- Brzeziński III coat of arms
- Brzeziński IV coat of arms
- Brzeziński V coat of arms
- Brzezowski coat of arms
- Brzezowski II coat of arms
- Brzeźnicki coat of arms
- Brzeżański coat of arms
- Brzeżecki coat of arms
- Brzeżewski coat of arms
- Brzoski coat of arms
- Brzostowski coat of arms
- Brzozowski coat of arms
- Brzozowski II coat of arms
- Brzozy coat of arms
- Brzuchański coat of arms
- Brzuchowiecki coat of arms
- Brzuchowiecki II coat of arms
- Brzuska coat of arms
- Brzyszkowski coat of arms
- Bucella coat of arms
- Bucen coat of arms
- Bucewicz coat of arms
- Buchholtz coat of arms
- Bucholc coat of arms
- Buchowiecki coat of arms
- Buchowiecki II coat of arms
- Buchta coat of arms
- Buchwaldt coat of arms
- Budkowski coat of arms
- Budrewicz coat of arms
- Budricki coat of arms
- Budwinski coat of arms
- Budyszyn coat of arms
- Budzanowski coat of arms
- Budzilo coat of arms
- Budzislaw coat of arms
- Budziwojowic coat of arms
- Bugajewski coat of arms
- Bugnerowicz coat of arms
- Bujakowski coat of arms
- Bujakowski II coat of arms
- Bujakowski III coat of arms
- Bujnicki coat of arms
- Bujwid coat of arms
- Bukaty coat of arms
- Bukont coat of arms
- Bukowczyk coat of arms
- Bukowski coat of arms
- Bukraba coat of arms
- Bulat coat of arms
- Bulhak coat of arms
- Burbach coat of arms
- Burchard-Bélaváry coat of arms
- Burghard coat of arms
- Burkard coat of arms
- Burnak coat of arms
- Burski coat of arms
- Bursztyn coat of arms
- Bury coat of arms
- Burzecki coat of arms
- Burzynski coat of arms
- Busse coat of arms
- Buszynski coat of arms
- Butler coat of arms
- Butler II coat of arms
- Buttler coat of arms
- Buttler II coat of arms
- Bybel coat of arms
- Bychawa coat of arms
- Bychowiec coat of arms
- Bychowski coat of arms
- Bydant coat of arms
- Bykowski coat of arms
- Bylina coat of arms
- Byliński coat of arms
- Bysinski coat of arms
- Bystram coat of arms
- Bystrzanowski coat of arms
- Bystrzonowski coat of arms
- Bystrzycki coat of arms
- Bytomski coat of arms

=== C ===
- Cackowski coat of arms
- Campioni coat of arms
- Carducci coat of arms
- Carmignano coat of arms
- Casafranca coat of arms
- Casanova coat of arms
- Ceceniowski coat of arms
- Celejów coat of arms
- Cellari coat of arms
- Cerkanowicz coat of arms
- Cetis coat of arms
- Cetnar coat of arms
- Cetner coat of arms
- Chai coat of arms
- Chalecki coat of arms
- Chambers coat of arms
- Chamier coat of arms
- Chamier II coat of arms
- Chamier III coat of arms
- Chamier IV coat of arms
- Chamir coat of arms
- Chanenko coat of arms
- Charczewski coat of arms
- Charczowski coat of arms
- Charis coat of arms
- Charyton coat of arms
- Chaudoir coat of arms
- Chełmowski coat of arms
- Chemnitz coat of arms
- Chereskul coat of arms
- Cheromowicz coat of arms
- Chilczewski coat of arms
- Chilczewski II coat of arms
- Chitry coat of arms
- Chlapowski coat of arms
- Chlapowski II coat of arms
- Chledowski coat of arms
- Chlibkiewicz coat of arms
- Chlibkiewicz II coat of arms
- Chlopicki coat of arms
- Chludziński coat of arms
- Chlusowicz coat of arms
- Chlusowicz II coat of arms
- Chlusowicz III coat of arms
- Chłędowski-Pfaffenhoffen coat of arms
- Chłusowicz coat of arms
- Chłusowicz II coat of arms
- Chmieliński coat of arms
- Chocimirski coat of arms
- Chodasiewicz coat of arms
- Chodkiewicz coat of arms
- Chodkiewicz II coat of arms
- Cholchowski coat of arms
- Cholewa coat of arms
- Cholewa II coat of arms
- Cholewiec coat of arms
- Chołoniewski coat of arms
- Chomąto coat of arms
- Chometowski coat of arms
- Chometowski II coat of arms
- Chometowski III coat of arms
- Chomiak coat of arms
- Chominski coat of arms
- Chorabala coat of arms
- Chorabala II coat of arms
- Choragwie coat of arms
- Choragwie II coat of arms
- Choragwie III coat of arms
- Choryński coat of arms
- Chośnicki coat of arms
- Chośnicki II coat of arms
- Chośnicki III coat of arms
- Chrapek coat of arms
- Chraplewski coat of arms
- Chrapowicki coat of arms
- Chreptowicz coat of arms
- Chromy coat of arms
- Chroniewski coat of arms
- Chróścieski coat of arms
- Chrynicki coat of arms
- Chrynicki II coat of arms
- Chrzanowski coat of arms
- Chrzanski coat of arms
- Chrzastowski coat of arms
- Chrzastowski II coat of arms
- Chrzestanowski coat of arms
- Chuchrowski coat of arms
- Chunowski coat of arms
- Chyliński coat of arms
- Chynowski coat of arms
- Ciborowski coat of arms
- Ciborski coat of arms
- Cichiński coat of arms
- Cichowski coat of arms
- Ciechanowicz coat of arms
- Ciechanowicz II coat of arms
- Ciechanowiecki coat of arms
- Ciechowski coat of arms
- Cielątkowa coat of arms
- Cielepaly coat of arms
- Cielepała coat of arms
- Cieleski coat of arms
- Ciemiński coat of arms
- Ciemiński II coat of arms
- Ciemiński III coat of arms
- Cienciewicz coat of arms
- Cieńcewicz coat of arms
- Cieszkowski coat of arms
- Cieszowicz coat of arms
- Cieszyca coat of arms
- Cietrzew coat of arms
- Cietrzew II coat of arms
- Ciezmer coat of arms
- Ciężosił coat of arms
- Cimerman coat of arms
- Ciołek coat of arms
- Ciołek II coat of arms
- Ciołek III coat of arms
- Ciołek IV coat of arms
- Cios coat of arms
- Cisewski coat of arms
- Cisewski III coat of arms
- Cisiewski coat of arms
- Cisowski coat of arms
- Clodt coat of arms
- Cygemberg coat of arms
- Cyngiel coat of arms
- Cypser coat of arms
- Cyremberg coat of arms
- Cyro coat of arms
- Cyrus coat of arms
- Cyrus II coat of arms
- Cywilkowski coat of arms
- Czachowski coat of arms
- Czacki coat of arms
- Czaderski coat of arms
- Czapiewski coat of arms
- Czapiewski II coat of arms
- Czapiewski III coat of arms
- Czapla coat of arms
- Czaplic coat of arms
- Czaplicki coat of arms
- Czaplicki II coat of arms
- Czapliński coat of arms
- Czapliński II coat of arms
- Czapski coat of arms
- Czara coat of arms
- Czarliński coat of arms
- Czarliński II coat of arms
- Czarliński III coat of arms
- Czarnecki coat of arms
- Czarnecki II coat of arms
- Czarnecki III coat of arms
- Czarnecki IV coat of arms
- Czarnecki V coat of arms
- Czarnicki coat of arms
- Czarnocki coat of arms
- Czarnoleski coat of arms
- Czarnoluski coat of arms
- Czarnowron coat of arms
- Czarnowski coat of arms
- Czarnowski II coat of arms
- Czarnowski III coat of arms
- Czarnysz coat of arms
- Czartoryski coat of arms
- Czartoryski II coat of arms
- Czarzyna coat of arms
- Czasza coat of arms
- Czaykowski coat of arms
- Czechowicz coat of arms
- Czechowicz II coat of arms
- Czechowski coat of arms
- Czecz coat of arms
- Czecz II coat of arms
- Czeczke coat of arms
- Czeki coat of arms
- Czelo coat of arms
- Czerlenkowski coat of arms
- Czernecki coat of arms
- Czerniawski coat of arms
- Czernicki coat of arms
- Czerniecki coat of arms
- Czerniewski coat of arms
- Czerny coat of arms
- Czernyszew coat of arms
- Czerwiakowski coat of arms
- Czerwinski coat of arms
- Czerwnia coat of arms
- Czerwony coat of arms
- Czetric coat of arms
- Czetwertyński coat of arms
- Czetwertyński II coat of arms
- Czewoja coat of arms
- Czewoja II coat of arms
- Czewoja III coat of arms
- Czibulka coat of arms
- Czirson coat of arms
- Czirson II coat of arms
- Czochron coat of arms
- Czochron II coat of arms
- Czornberg coat of arms
- Czorny coat of arms
- Czosnowski coat of arms
- Cztery Klamry coat of arms
- Czudnochowski coat of arms
- Czuhaj coat of arms
- Czuhajewski coat of arms
- Czuwasz coat of arms
- Czwalina coat of arms
- Czyczwic coat of arms
- Czyczwitz coat of arms
- Czyrski coat of arms
- Czyszyński coat of arms
- Czyż coat of arms

=== D ===
- Daczycki coat of arms
- Dalibór coat of arms
- Dalibór II coat of arms
- Dalibór III coat of arms
- Dalinski coat of arms
- Dambski coat of arms
- Damerkow coat of arms
- Danczenko coat of arms
- Danewitz coat of arms
- Dangel coat of arms
- Dangiel coat of arms
- Dangiel II coat of arms
- Daniel coat of arms
- Danisiewicz coat of arms
- Daniszewski coat of arms
- Danowicz coat of arms
- Dantyszek coat of arms
- Dantyszek II coat of arms
- Daobrowo Korab coat of arms
- Dar coat of arms
- Darewski coat of arms
- Dargicz coat of arms
- Dargolewski coat of arms
- Dargolewski II coat of arms
- Dargolewski III coat of arms
- Dargolewski IV coat of arms
- Dargun coat of arms
- Darguż coat of arms
- Darguż II coat of arms
- Daszkiewicz coat of arms
- Daszkiewicz II coat of arms
- Daukowicz coat of arms
- Dąb coat of arms
- Dąb II coat of arms
- Dąb IV coat of arms
- Dąbrowa coat of arms
- Dąbrowicki coat of arms
- Dąbrowo Korab coat of arms
- Dąbrowo-Korab coat of arms
- Dąbrowski coat of arms
- Dąbrowski II coat of arms
- Dąbrowski III coat of arms
- Dąbrowski IV coat of arms
- Dąbrówka coat of arms
- De Laurans coat of arms
- De Laveau coat of arms
- Deboli coat of arms
- Deciusz coat of arms
- Decykiewicz coat of arms
- Dederkalo coat of arms
- Dederkalo II coat of arms
- Delpacy coat of arms
- Delpacy II coat of arms
- Delpacy III coat of arms
- Dembicki coat of arms
- Dembiński coat of arms
- Dembowski coat of arms
- Dembowski II coat of arms
- Demiński coat of arms
- Demryc coat of arms
- Demryc II coat of arms
- Demuth coat of arms
- Demuth II coat of arms
- Denaw coat of arms
- Denhof coat of arms
- Denhoff coat of arms
- Denhoff II coat of arms
- Denhoff III coat of arms
- Denis coat of arms
- Denis II coat of arms
- Denmark coat of arms
- Denmark II coat of arms
- Dermont coat of arms
- Desier coat of arms
- Deskur coat of arms
- Despot coat of arms
- Dessau coat of arms
- Deszpot coat of arms
- Desztrunk coat of arms
- Deter coat of arms
- Deybel coat of arms
- Dębicki coat of arms
- Dębicki II coat of arms
- Dębicz coat of arms
- Dębicz II coat of arms
- Dębnik coat of arms
- Dębno coat of arms
- Dębno II coat of arms
- Dęboli coat of arms
- Dęboróg coat of arms
- Dęboróg II coat of arms
- Diadkowski coat of arms
- Dittrich coat of arms
- Długajski coat of arms
- Dłuhomil coat of arms
- Dłuhomil II coat of arms
- Dobenek coat of arms
- Dobenek II coat of arms
- Dobija coat of arms
- Dobrodziejski coat of arms
- Dobrorad coat of arms
- Dobrowolski coat of arms
- Dobrowolski II coat of arms
- Dobruski coat of arms
- Dobrzenski coat of arms
- Dobrzenski II coat of arms
- Dobszyc coat of arms
- Dolabedz coat of arms
- Dolaczko coat of arms
- Dolezel coat of arms
- Doliniański coat of arms
- Dolinski coat of arms
- Dolinski II coat of arms
- Dolinski III coat of arms
- Doliwa coat of arms
- Dolmat coat of arms
- Dolski coat of arms
- Dolszkiewicz coat of arms
- Dołęga III coat of arms
- Dołęga IV coat of arms
- Domagalicz coat of arms
- Domagost coat of arms
- Domamirczowski coat of arms
- Domaradzki coat of arms
- Domaradzki II coat of arms
- Domaradzki III coat of arms
- Domont coat of arms
- Domontowicz coat of arms
- Donat coat of arms
- Donat II coat of arms
- Donau coat of arms
- Dopomian coat of arms
- Dorflinger coat of arms
- Dorflinger II coat of arms
- Dormus coat of arms
- Dornbach coat of arms
- Dorohostajski coat of arms
- Dorohostajski II coat of arms
- Doroszenko coat of arms
- Dorpowski II coat of arms
- Dorsz coat of arms
- Doschot coat of arms
- Dosluga coat of arms
- Dost coat of arms
- Dostojewski coat of arms
- Dotrzyma coat of arms
- Dowbor coat of arms
- Dowgiałło coat of arms
- Dołęga coat of arms
- Dołęga II coat of arms
- Domaros coat of arms
- Donimirski coat of arms
- Doręgowski coat of arms
- Dorpowski coat of arms
- Dorzyn coat of arms
- Dote coat of arms
- Dowgird coat of arms
- Dowiat coat of arms
- Dowkgul coat of arms
- Downarowicz coat of arms
- Dragowski coat of arms
- Drake coat of arms
- Drangwitz coat of arms
- Drdacki coat of arms
- Dressel coat of arms
- Drobysz coat of arms
- Drobysz II coat of arms
- Drogodar coat of arms
- Drogomir coat of arms
- Drogoslaw II coat of arms
- Drogosław coat of arms
- Drohojowski coat of arms
- Drozdowski coat of arms
- Druck coat of arms
- Drucki-Sokoliński coat of arms
- Druzbacki coat of arms
- Drużyłowski coat of arms
- Drużyna coat of arms
- Dryja coat of arms
- Dryja II coat of arms
- Dryja III coat of arms
- Dryja IV coat of arms
- Drzewica coat of arms
- Drzewica II coat of arms
- Drzewica III coat of arms
- Dubenitz coat of arms
- Dubieński coat of arms
- Dubina coat of arms
- Dubowik coat of arms
- Dubrowski coat of arms
- Dudicz coat of arms
- Dudicz II coat of arms
- Dudkowicz coat of arms
- Duhamel coat of arms
- Duleba coat of arms
- Dulfus coat of arms
- Dulicz coat of arms
- Dulicz III coat of arms
- Dullak coat of arms
- Dulski coat of arms
- Dułak coat of arms
- Dułak II coat of arms
- Dułak III coat of arms
- Dułak IV coat of arms
- Dumbiaha coat of arms
- Duminski coat of arms
- Duniewicz coat of arms
- Duniewicz II coat of arms
- Dunin coat of arms
- Dunin II coat of arms
- Duryewski coat of arms
- Duszek coat of arms
- Duszyñski coat of arms
- Dutczynski coat of arms
- Dwojgryf coat of arms
- Dworzanski coat of arms
- Dyakowski coat of arms
- Dybowski coat of arms
- Dybowski II coat of arms
- Dymsza coat of arms
- Dzialynski coat of arms
- Dzialynski II coat of arms
- Działosza coat of arms
- Dzianott coat of arms
- Dziboni coat of arms
- Dzidowski coat of arms
- Dzieciol coat of arms
- Dzieciol II coat of arms
- Dzieduszycki coat of arms
- Dzieduszycki II coat of arms
- Dziedziul coat of arms
- Dziedziul III coat of arms
- Dziejosław coat of arms
- Dziekonski coat of arms
- Dziengiel coat of arms
- Dzierszynski coat of arms
- Dzierzanowski coat of arms
- Dzierzanowski II coat of arms
- Dzierzanowski III coat of arms
- Dzierzbicki coat of arms
- Dziewolski coat of arms
- Dziewunty coat of arms
- Dzięcielski coat of arms
- Dzięcielski II coat of arms
- Dziob coat of arms
- Dziobek coat of arms
- Dziokowski coat of arms
- Dziryt coat of arms
- Dziuli coat of arms
- Dziurkiewicz coat of arms
- Dzwonki coat of arms

=== E ===
- Eberc coat of arms
- Eberhard coat of arms
- Eberhardt coat of arms
- Ebert coat of arms
- Eder coat of arms
- Egersdorff coat of arms
- Ehler coat of arms
- Eichholtz coat of arms
- Eichholtz II coat of arms
- Einberger coat of arms
- Ejgird coat of arms
- Ejnarowicz coat of arms
- Ellgier coat of arms
- Elsner coat of arms
- Elzanowski II coat of arms
- Elzanowski III coat of arms
- Emberk coat of arms
- Engel coat of arms
- Engelke coat of arms
- Engestrem coat of arms
- Englisch coat of arms
- Enzendorfer coat of arms
- Epinger coat of arms
- Epinger II coat of arms
- Epselwitz coat of arms
- Epselwitz II coat of arms
- Epstein coat of arms
- Erbs coat of arms
- Erkinian coat of arms
- Essen coat of arms
- Estken coat of arms
- Estreicher coat of arms
- Etingen coat of arms
- Etmajer coat of arms
- Ettmayer coat of arms

=== F ===
- Faber coat of arms
- Fajerhak coat of arms
- Fakinetti coat of arms
- Falck coat of arms
- Falk coat of arms
- Falk II coat of arms
- Falkenberg coat of arms
- Fanellis coat of arms
- Farensbach coat of arms
- Farensbach II coat of arms
- Fargow coat of arms
- Faruchowicz coat of arms
- Feckowicz coat of arms
- Felden coat of arms
- Felden II coat of arms
- Felkerzamb coat of arms
- Felsztyński coat of arms
- Ferber coat of arms
- Ferber II coat of arms
- Ferdinando coat of arms
- Fernberg coat of arms
- Ferner coat of arms
- Fienienko coat of arms
- Fierich coat of arms
- Figenau coat of arms
- Figietty coat of arms
- Fihauser coat of arms
- Fijalkiewicz coat of arms
- Fincke coat of arms
- Fink coat of arms
- Fischer coat of arms
- Fischer II coat of arms
- Fisz coat of arms
- Fiszer coat of arms
- Fiszer II coat of arms
- Fiszer III coat of arms
- Fleming coat of arms
- Fleury coat of arms
- Florkiewicz coat of arms
- Foerster coat of arms
- Fogelveder coat of arms
- Foks coat of arms
- Fontana coat of arms
- Fracki coat of arms
- Fracki II coat of arms
- Frangebarg coat of arms
- Frank coat of arms
- Frank II coat of arms
- Frankenberg coat of arms
- Frantzius coat of arms
- Frebner coat of arms
- Frediani coat of arms
- Fredro coat of arms
- Freindl coat of arms
- Frejberg coat of arms
- Frenkel coat of arms
- Frentzel coat of arms
- Freyberg coat of arms
- Freyhold coat of arms
- Freznel coat of arms
- Fribes coat of arms
- Fricke coat of arms
- Friedhuber coat of arms
- Frycz coat of arms
- Frydhuber coat of arms
- Frydmann coat of arms
- Fryze coat of arms
- Fuchs coat of arms
- Fuengirola coat of arms
- Fukier coat of arms
- Furnier coat of arms

=== G ===
- Gableniec coat of arms
- Gadon coat of arms
- Gadon II coat of arms
- Gaier coat of arms
- Gajewski coat of arms
- Gajl coat of arms
- Galagan coat of arms
- Galau coat of arms
- Galecki coat of arms
- Galenkowski coat of arms
- Galera coat of arms
- Gallo coat of arms
- Ganske coat of arms
- Garapich coat of arms
- Garczynskir coat of arms
- Garczyński coat of arms
- Garczyński II coat of arms
- Garczyński III coat of arms
- Gardani coat of arms
- Gartenberg coat of arms
- Gasiecki coat of arms
- Gasowski coat of arms
- Gaudeker coat of arms
- Gawalowski coat of arms
- Gawlowski coat of arms
- Gawron coat of arms
- Gawronar coat of arms
- Gącz coat of arms
- Gąska coat of arms
- Gąska II coat of arms
- Gąska III coat of arms
- Gebel coat of arms
- Gedroyc coat of arms
- Gedroyc II coat of arms
- Gedroyc IV coat of arms
- Gedroyc V coat of arms
- Geisler coat of arms
- Genderych coat of arms
- Gentils coat of arms
- Geometer coat of arms
- Geppert coat of arms
- Geppert II coat of arms
- Gerber coat of arms
- Geret coat of arms
- Gering coat of arms
- Geringer coat of arms
- Gerne coat of arms
- Gerstmann coat of arms
- Gersztorf coat of arms
- Geszaw coat of arms
- Gibicki coat of arms
- Giedrojć coat of arms
- Giejsz coat of arms
- Giejsztor coat of arms
- Giełgud coat of arms
- Gieraltowski coat of arms
- Gieraltowski II coat of arms
- Gierałt coat of arms
- Gierczynski coat of arms
- Gierlach coat of arms
- Gierszt coat of arms
- Giezycki coat of arms
- Gileczynski coat of arms
- Ginowski coat of arms
- Gintar coat of arms
- Ginter coat of arms
- Ginwiłł coat of arms
- Girk coat of arms
- Girski coat of arms
- Girski II coat of arms
- Giza coat of arms
- Giza II coat of arms
- Giza IV coat of arms
- Gizbert coat of arms
- Gizycki coat of arms
- Glaubicz coat of arms
- Gliński coat of arms
- Gliński II coat of arms
- Gliński III coat of arms
- Gliszczyński coat of arms
- Gliszczyński II coat of arms
- Gliszczyński III coat of arms
- Gliszczyński IV coat of arms
- Gliszczyński V coat of arms
- Gliszczyński VII coat of arms
- Glogorski coat of arms
- Gloskow coat of arms
- Glotz coat of arms
- Glower coat of arms
- Główczewski coat of arms
- Główczewski II coat of arms
- Główczewski III coat of arms
- Głuchowski coat of arms
- Gnadkowski coat of arms
- Gniazdowa coat of arms
- Gnieszawa coat of arms
- Gniewiewski coat of arms
- Gniewosz coat of arms
- Gnoinski coat of arms
- Gockowski coat of arms
- Goclawski coat of arms
- Gocz coat of arms
- Goczalkowski coat of arms
- Goczkowski coat of arms
- Goddentow coat of arms
- Godlewski coat of arms
- Godula coat of arms
- Goduszewski coat of arms
- Godzieba coat of arms
- Godziemba coat of arms
- Godzislaw coat of arms
- Goebel coat of arms
- Goetz coat of arms
- Gogojewicz coat of arms
- Gogol coat of arms
- Gogolinski coat of arms
- Golab coat of arms
- Golaszewski coat of arms
- Golc coat of arms
- Goledzinowski coat of arms
- Golejewski coat of arms
- Golembiowski coat of arms
- Golinski coat of arms
- Golocki coat of arms
- Golski coat of arms
- Gołuchowski coat of arms
- Gomolinski coat of arms
- Goncz coat of arms
- Goncz II coat of arms
- Goncz III coat of arms
- Goniecki coat of arms
- Goniębicki coat of arms
- Gorawin coat of arms
- Gorbacki coat of arms
- Gorczyczowski coat of arms
- Gorczynski coat of arms
- Gordon coat of arms
- Gordon II coat of arms
- Gorecki coat of arms
- Gorłowski coat of arms
- Gorski coat of arms
- Gory coat of arms
- Gorzeński coat of arms
- Gosiewski coat of arms
- Goski coat of arms
- Goslawski coat of arms
- Gostkowski coat of arms
- Gostkowski II coat of arms
- Gostomski coat of arms
- Gostomski II coat of arms
- Gostomski III coat of arms
- Goszynski coat of arms
- Gottesmann coat of arms
- Gotz coat of arms
- Gowinski coat of arms
- Gozdawa coat of arms
- Gozdawa II coat of arms
- Gozdawa III coat of arms
- Gozdawa IV coat of arms
- Górka coat of arms
- Graban coat of arms
- Grabie coat of arms
- Grabie II coat of arms
- Grabie III coat of arms
- Grabienski coat of arms
- Grabisz coat of arms
- Grabowiec coat of arms
- Grabowiecki coat of arms
- Grabowiecki II coat of arms
- Grabowski coat of arms
- Grabowski II coat of arms
- Grabowski III coat of arms
- Grabowski IV coat of arms
- Grabowski VI coat of arms
- Grabowski VIII coat of arms
- Grabowski IX coat of arms
- Grabowski X coat of arms
- Grabowskir coat of arms
- Graefe coat of arms
- Graff coat of arms
- Gralat coat of arms
- Grammlich coat of arms
- Gran coat of arms
- Grange coat of arms
- Gransberger coat of arms
- Gratta coat of arms
- Grąbkowski coat of arms
- Grebecki coat of arms
- Greben coat of arms
- Greber coat of arms
- Gregorski coat of arms
- Grek coat of arms
- Grek II coat of arms
- Grela coat of arms
- Grela II coat of arms
- Gretz coat of arms
- Gretz II coat of arms
- Greyfeld coat of arms
- Grisheim coat of arms
- Grocholski coat of arms
- Grocholskir coat of arms
- Grodzicki coat of arms
- Gromadzki coat of arms
- Gromiec coat of arms
- Gross coat of arms
- Grothus coat of arms
- Grotowski coat of arms
- Grotowski II coat of arms
- Grotus coat of arms
- Groty coat of arms
- Gródek coat of arms
- Gruba II coat of arms
- Gruchała coat of arms
- Grudzinski coat of arms
- Grumbkow coat of arms
- Grumbkow II coat of arms
- Grunwalth coat of arms
- Gruszczyński coat of arms
- Gryf coat of arms
- Gryf II coat of arms
- Gryf V coat of arms
- Gryf VI coat of arms
- Gryforoz coat of arms
- Grynfar coat of arms
- Gryziewicz coat of arms
- Gryzima coat of arms
- Grzebin coat of arms
- Grzebinski coat of arms
- Grzębski coat of arms
- Grzybowski coat of arms
- Grzymala II coat of arms
- Grzymala III coat of arms
- Grzymala IV coat of arms
- Grzymala V coat of arms
- Grzymala VI coat of arms
- Grzymała coat of arms
- Gubalta coat of arms
- Gubena coat of arms
- Guczy coat of arms
- Gudowicz coat of arms
- Gugenmus coat of arms
- Guldenbank coat of arms
- Guldenstern coat of arms
- Gumowski coat of arms
- Gurowski coat of arms
- Gurski coat of arms
- Gusnar coat of arms
- Gussmann coat of arms
- Gut coat of arms
- Gut II coat of arms
- Gutag coat of arms
- Gutak coat of arms
- Gutakowski coat of arms
- Guteter coat of arms
- Gutowski coat of arms
- Gutry coat of arms
- Guttry coat of arms
- Guzkowski coat of arms
- Gwagnin coat of arms
- Gwiazda coat of arms
- Gwiazdowilk coat of arms
- Gwiazdowski coat of arms
- Gwiazdy coat of arms
- Gwiaździcz coat of arms
- Gyss coat of arms

=== H ===
- Haan coat of arms
- Habermann coat of arms
- Habich coat of arms
- Hadziewicz coat of arms
- Hagen coat of arms
- Hagenau coat of arms
- Hagendorn coat of arms
- Hahn coat of arms
- Hake coat of arms
- Haki coat of arms
- Halban coat of arms
- Halban II coat of arms
- Halcnowski coat of arms
- Halecki coat of arms
- Halecki II coat of arms
- Haller coat of arms
- Hankiewicz coat of arms
- Harasiewicz coat of arms
- Harasowski coat of arms
- Harasymowicz coat of arms
- Harsdorf coat of arms
- Hasselquist coat of arms
- Hatten coat of arms
- Haubicki coat of arms
- Haugwicz coat of arms
- Haugwicz II coat of arms
- Haukeosak coat of arms
- Hauser coat of arms
- Hauszyld coat of arms
- Hawranowski coat of arms
- Hawrat coat of arms
- Hayderer coat of arms
- Haza coat of arms
- Heinzel coat of arms
- Hejdebrand coat of arms
- Hejdel coat of arms
- Hejdenpol coat of arms
- Hejdenstein coat of arms
- Hejking coat of arms
- Hejmer coat of arms
- Hekel coat of arms
- Hekier coat of arms
- Helbich coat of arms
- Helden coat of arms
- Heleniec coat of arms
- Helt coat of arms
- Hełm coat of arms
- Hemeling coat of arms
- Hempel coat of arms
- Hengowski coat of arms
- Henikstein coat of arms
- Hening coat of arms
- Hening II coat of arms
- Henisz coat of arms
- Henisz II coat of arms
- Hepner coat of arms
- Heppen coat of arms
- Heppener coat of arms
- Herburt coat of arms
- Herenszwand coat of arms
- Herkulea coat of arms
- Herman coat of arms
- Herner coat of arms
- Hertyk coat of arms
- Heydel coat of arms
- Hiche coat of arms
- Higersberger coat of arms
- Hilburg coat of arms
- Hilchen coat of arms
- Hilgers coat of arms
- Hiltenbrand coat of arms
- Hilzen coat of arms
- Hipocentaur coat of arms
- Hipocentaur II coat of arms
- Hipper coat of arms
- Hippocentaurus coat of arms
- Hirsch II coat of arms
- Hirsz coat of arms
- Hirszberg coat of arms
- Hiz coat of arms
- Hizdeff coat of arms
- Hladko coat of arms
- Hlasko coat of arms
- Hlebowski coat of arms
- Hluszcza coat of arms
- Hłuszanin coat of arms
- Hobgarski coat of arms
- Hodyc coat of arms
- Hoffman coat of arms
- Hoffmann coat of arms
- Hofner coat of arms
- Hohenauer coat of arms
- Holczynowski coat of arms
- Holfeld coat of arms
- Holnicki coat of arms
- Holstinhausen coat of arms
- Holszański coat of arms
- Holtej coat of arms
- Holter coat of arms
- Holub coat of arms
- Holub II coat of arms
- Holynski coat of arms
- Hołobok coat of arms
- Hołowiński coat of arms
- Hołownia coat of arms
- Hołownia II coat of arms
- Homicki coat of arms
- Homolacz coat of arms
- Homolacz II coat of arms
- Hondorf coat of arms
- Hoppe coat of arms
- Hordyjowski coat of arms
- Hordziewicz coat of arms
- Hormuzaki coat of arms
- Hornowski coat of arms
- Hornowski II coat of arms
- Hornowski IV coat of arms
- Horoch coat of arms
- Horoch Baron coat of arms
- Horowitz coat of arms
- Horwat coat of arms
- Hoschek coat of arms
- Hozyusz coat of arms
- Hryniewiecki coat of arms
- Hubarewicz coat of arms
- Huebner coat of arms
- Hulewicz coat of arms
- Hummitsch coat of arms
- Humnicki coat of arms
- Hun coat of arms
- Hurko coat of arms
- Hurski coat of arms
- Husarzewski coat of arms
- Husarzewski II coat of arms
- Huszcza coat of arms
- Hutor coat of arms
- Hutten coat of arms
- Hutten-Czapski coat of arms
- Huwald coat of arms
- Huzing coat of arms
- Hybener coat of arms
- Hybryda coat of arms
- Hybryda II coat of arms

=== I ===
- Igelstrem coat of arms
- Ike coat of arms
- Ilgowski coat of arms
- Ilinski coat of arms
- Iljak coat of arms
- Ilmanowski coat of arms
- Ilnicki coat of arms
- Ilowski coat of arms
- Isajewicz coat of arms
- Isajkowski coat of arms
- Isiora coat of arms
- Iskierski coat of arms
- Iskrzycki coat of arms
- Iszkowski coat of arms
- Iwanicki coat of arms
- Iwanienko coat of arms
- Iwanowicz coat of arms
- Iwanowski coat of arms
- Iwanski coat of arms
- Izabeliusz coat of arms
- Izwolski coat of arms
- Izykowski coat of arms

=== J ===
- Jablonowskir coat of arms
- Jablonski coat of arms
- Jablonski II coat of arms
- Jabłonowski coat of arms
- Jabłonowski II coat of arms
- Jachimowicz coat of arms
- Jachimowicz II coat of arms
- Jachowicz coat of arms
- Jachta coat of arms
- Jackowicz coat of arms
- Jacyna coat of arms
- Jaczynski coat of arms
- Jadamka coat of arms
- Jadunka coat of arms
- Jaegerman coat of arms
- Jagnię coat of arms
- Jagodowicz coat of arms
- Jahnke coat of arms
- Jahoda coat of arms
- Jakimowicz coat of arms
- Jakimowicz II coat of arms
- Jakobson coat of arms
- Jakowiecki coat of arms
- Jakubowicz coat of arms
- Jakubowicz II coat of arms
- Jakubowicz III coat of arms
- Jakubowicz IV coat of arms
- Jakubowski coat of arms
- Jakubowski II coat of arms
- Jakubowski III coat of arms
- Jakubowski IV coat of arms
- Jakubowskiar coat of arms
- Jakuszewski coat of arms
- Jalowka coat of arms
- Jalowka II coat of arms
- Jalowski coat of arms
- Jalozo coat of arms
- Janadar coat of arms
- Janadar II coat of arms
- Janczewski coat of arms
- Janicz coat of arms
- Janina coat of arms
- Janina II coat of arms
- Jankiewicz coat of arms
- Jankiewitz coat of arms
- Jankowicz coat of arms
- Jankowski coat of arms
- Janorenski coat of arms
- Janowski coat of arms
- Janowski II coat of arms
- Janowski III coat of arms
- Janowski IV coat of arms
- Janowski V coat of arms
- Janski coat of arms
- Janta coat of arms
- Janta II coat of arms
- Janulewicz coat of arms
- Januszowicz coat of arms
- Januszowski coat of arms
- Jara (herb szlachecki) coat of arms
- Jaraczewski coat of arms
- Jaraczewskir coat of arms
- Jark coat of arms
- Jarocki coat of arms
- Jarocki II coat of arms
- Jaroczewski coat of arms
- Jarosław coat of arms
- Jarosz coat of arms
- Jaroszynski coat of arms
- Jarzborowski coat of arms
- Jasieniecki coat of arms
- Jasieniecki III coat of arms
- Jasienski coat of arms
- Jasienski II coat of arms
- Jasienski III coat of arms
- Jasieńczyk coat of arms
- Jasieńczyk II coat of arms
- Jasieńczyk III coat of arms
- Jasinski coat of arms
- Jasion coat of arms
- Jasiwcicz coat of arms
- Jaskiewicz coat of arms
- Jaskolecki coat of arms
- Jaskulecki coat of arms
- Jastrzebczyk coat of arms
- Jastrzebski coat of arms
- Jastrzebski II coat of arms
- Jastrzebski III coat of arms
- Jastrzębiec coat of arms
- Jastrzębiec IV coat of arms
- Jastrzębiec V coat of arms
- Jastrzębiec VI coat of arms
- Jaszczold coat of arms
- Jaślin coat of arms
- Jaworski coat of arms
- Jaworski II coat of arms
- Jaworski III coat of arms
- Jazgarek coat of arms
- Jazwinski coat of arms
- Jeden coat of arms
- Jedlina coat of arms
- Jelce coat of arms
- Jelce II coat of arms
- Jelenski coat of arms
- Jelenski II coat of arms
- Jeleń coat of arms
- Jeleń II coat of arms
- Jelita coat of arms
- Jelita II coat of arms
- Jelita III coat of arms
- Jelowicki II coat of arms
- Jelski coat of arms
- Jełowicki coat of arms
- Jendrzejowicz coat of arms
- Jenonia coat of arms
- Jerlicz coat of arms
- Jerzmanowski coat of arms
- Jerzysław coat of arms
- Jeschke coat of arms
- Jeski coat of arms
- Jeski II coat of arms
- Jezierski coat of arms
- Jezierski II coat of arms
- Jezierza coat of arms
- Jezierza II coat of arms
- Jeziora coat of arms
- Jeż coat of arms
- Jeżewski coat of arms
- Jodłowski coat of arms
- Jodzieszko coat of arms
- Johoannot coat of arms
- Jordan coat of arms
- Jordan II coat of arms
- Jordan III coat of arms
- Juchnowski coat of arms
- Judycki coat of arms
- Jundzill coat of arms
- Junicki coat of arms
- Junosza coat of arms
- Junosza II coat of arms
- Junosza III coat of arms
- Junosza IV coat of arms
- Junosza V coat of arms
- Junosza VI coat of arms
- Juńczyk coat of arms
- Juńczyk II coat of arms
- Juracha coat of arms
- Jurgielewski coat of arms
- Jurgiewicz coat of arms
- Jurgiewicz coat of arms
- Jurgiewicz II coat of arms
- Jurjejowicz coat of arms
- Jurkiewicz coat of arms
- Jurowski coat of arms
- Jurystowski coat of arms
- Jurzyc coat of arms
- Justimonti coat of arms
- Juszynski coat of arms
- Juszynski II coat of arms
- Jutrzenka coat of arms
- Jutrzenka II coat of arms
- Jutrzenka III coat of arms
- Jutrzenka IV coat of arms
- Juźwikiewicz coat of arms

=== K ===
- Kabat coat of arms
- Kabat II coat of arms
- Kacki coat of arms
- Kacler coat of arms
- Kacler II coat of arms
- Kaczanowski coat of arms
- Kadlubski coat of arms
- Kadyszewicz coat of arms
- Kadyszewicz II coat of arms
- Kaftanowski coat of arms
- Kajdasz coat of arms
- Kajser coat of arms
- Kajszyly coat of arms
- Kajzerling coat of arms
- Kalaw coat of arms
- Kalinowa coat of arms
- Kalinowski coat of arms
- Kalitowski coat of arms
- Kalkrejt coat of arms
- Kalksztejn coat of arms
- Kallir coat of arms
- Kalm coat of arms
- Kalniewicz coat of arms
- Kaluszowski coat of arms
- Kalwaria coat of arms
- Kałmucki coat of arms
- Kaman coat of arms
- Kamecki coat of arms
- Kamienczyk coat of arms
- Kamieniec coat of arms
- Kamienski coat of arms
- Kamienski II coat of arms
- Kamienski III coat of arms
- Kamienski IV coat of arms
- Kaminski coat of arms
- Kaminski II coat of arms
- Kaminski III coat of arms
- Kampenhauzen coat of arms
- Kandor coat of arms
- Kandyba coat of arms
- Kanicz coat of arms
- Kaniewski coat of arms
- Kaniowski coat of arms
- Kantakuzen coat of arms
- Kapica coat of arms
- Kapostas coat of arms
- Kapri coat of arms
- Kapus coat of arms
- Kar coat of arms
- Kara coat of arms
- Karaczynski coat of arms
- Karalio coat of arms
- Karasinski coat of arms
- Karasz coat of arms
- Karczewski coat of arms
- Karęga coat of arms
- Karęga II coat of arms
- Kariatyda coat of arms
- Karlowicz coat of arms
- Karlowicz II coat of arms
- Karminski coat of arms
- Karnicki coat of arms
- Karnicki II coat of arms
- Karnicki III coat of arms
- Karnicki IV coat of arms
- Karnowski coat of arms
- Karozi coat of arms
- Karp coat of arms
- Karp II coat of arms
- Karpinski coat of arms
- Karsza coat of arms
- Karśnicki coat of arms
- Karwatski coat of arms
- Karwinski coat of arms
- Karwowski coat of arms
- Kasimowicz coat of arms
- Kasimowicz II coat of arms
- Kasinowski coat of arms
- Kasparek coat of arms
- Kasperowski coat of arms
- Kasprzycki coat of arms
- Kasprzycki II coat of arms
- Kastelli coat of arms
- Kaszowski coat of arms
- Kaszyc coat of arms
- Kaulfus coat of arms
- Kawanis coat of arms
- Kawiecki coat of arms
- Kazanowicz coat of arms
- Kazanski coat of arms
- Kazkowicz coat of arms
- Kątny coat of arms
- Kczewski coat of arms
- Kelcz coat of arms
- Kellermann coat of arms
- Kelles coat of arms
- Kemlada coat of arms
- Kemnicz coat of arms
- Kempinski coat of arms
- Kempinski II coat of arms
- Kempski coat of arms
- Kenigsfels coat of arms
- Kern coat of arms
- Kesicki coat of arms
- Kessowski coat of arms
- Kesztort coat of arms
- Kęczewski coat of arms
- Kęszycki coat of arms
- Kętrzyński coat of arms
- Kętrzyński III coat of arms
- Kiciński coat of arms
- Kiczki coat of arms
- Kiedrowski coat of arms
- Kiedrowski II coat of arms
- Kiedrowski III coat of arms
- Kiena coat of arms
- Kierdeja coat of arms
- Kierlo II coat of arms
- Kierło coat of arms
- Kiersnowski coat of arms
- Kiersnowski II coat of arms
- Kietlicz coat of arms
- Kietlicz II coat of arms
- Kietlicz III coat of arms
- Kijanin coat of arms
- Kijowski coat of arms
- Kikul coat of arms
- Kilian coat of arms
- Kimbar coat of arms
- Kimbar II coat of arms
- Kirkor coat of arms
- Kirkor II coat of arms
- Kirstein coat of arms
- Kirszensztejn coat of arms
- Kisiel coat of arms
- Kistowski coat of arms
- Kita coat of arms
- Kitz coat of arms
- Kiwalski coat of arms
- Kizierycki coat of arms
- Kizynek coat of arms
- Kizynek II coat of arms
- Kladrubski coat of arms
- Klamry coat of arms
- Kleczewski coat of arms
- Kleczkowski coat of arms
- Kleczowski coat of arms
- Kleeberg coat of arms
- Kleinfeld coat of arms
- Kleist coat of arms
- Kleman coat of arms
- Klement coat of arms
- Klesczowski coat of arms
- Kleszczyński coat of arms
- Kleympolt coat of arms
- Klicki coat of arms
- Kliczkowski coat of arms
- Klimas coat of arms
- Klimkiewicz coat of arms
- Klimkowski coat of arms
- Klimkowski II coat of arms
- Kliński coat of arms
- Klisner coat of arms
- Klobar coat of arms
- Klobassa coat of arms
- Klonicki coat of arms
- Klopmann coat of arms
- Klopot coat of arms
- Klos coat of arms
- Klosnik II coat of arms
- Klosy coat of arms
- Klot coat of arms
- Kluczewski coat of arms
- Kluczewski II coat of arms
- Kluczyc coat of arms
- Klug coat of arms
- Kluszewski coat of arms
- Kłanicki coat of arms
- Kłączyński coat of arms
- Kłopotek coat of arms
- Kłośnik coat of arms
- Kmita coat of arms
- Knappe coat of arms
- Knebel coat of arms
- Kniaziewicz coat of arms
- Kniaziewicz II coat of arms
- Knobelsdorf coat of arms
- Knolle coat of arms
- Knut coat of arms
- Koboszynski coat of arms
- Kobylenski coat of arms
- Kobylinski coat of arms
- Kobylka coat of arms
- Kobylski coat of arms
- Kochalowski coat of arms
- Kochanowski coat of arms
- Kochanowski II coat of arms
- Kochanowski III coat of arms
- Kochcicki coat of arms
- Kociubinski coat of arms
- Koczanski coat of arms
- Koczela coat of arms
- Koczorowski coat of arms
- Koczubej coat of arms
- Koczwara coat of arms
- Koeller coat of arms
- Koerber coat of arms
- Kogutowicz coat of arms
- Kojen coat of arms
- Kojkowski coat of arms
- Kokcej coat of arms
- Kokler coat of arms
- Kola coat of arms
- Kolaczkowski coat of arms
- Kolakowski coat of arms
- Kolataj coat of arms
- Kolb coat of arms
- Kolczyk coat of arms
- Kolczyk II coat of arms
- Kolczyk III coat of arms
- Kolczyk IV coat of arms
- Koleczycki coat of arms
- Koleda coat of arms
- Kolenda coat of arms
- Kolenski coat of arms
- Kolenski II coat of arms
- Kolinski coat of arms
- Kolinski II coat of arms
- Kolkowski coat of arms
- Kolkowski II coat of arms
- Kollatorowicz coat of arms
- Kolmasz coat of arms
- Kolmer coat of arms
- Kolnicki coat of arms
- Kolobrzeg coat of arms
- Kolodyn coat of arms
- Kolodyn IV coat of arms
- Kolumnakrzyd coat of arms
- Kolyszka coat of arms
- Komanski coat of arms
- Komar coat of arms
- Komarnicki coat of arms
- Komarowski coat of arms
- Komarzewski coat of arms
- Komoniaka coat of arms
- Komorowski coat of arms
- Komorowski II coat of arms
- Komorowski III coat of arms
- Komorowski IV coat of arms
- Komorski coat of arms
- Komowski coat of arms
- Konarski coat of arms
- Konarski II coat of arms
- Konarzewski coat of arms
- Koncza coat of arms
- Kończyc coat of arms
- Kończyc II coat of arms
- Kończyc III coat of arms
- Konderski coat of arms
- Kondracki coat of arms
- Kondratowicz coat of arms
- Koniecki coat of arms
- Koniecpolski coat of arms
- Königslow coat of arms
- Koninski coat of arms
- Koniski coat of arms
- Konogecki coat of arms
- Konojacki coat of arms
- Kononowicz coat of arms
- Konopka coat of arms
- Konrad coat of arms
- Konrady coat of arms
- Kopacz coat of arms
- Kopaszyna coat of arms
- Kopaszyna II coat of arms
- Kopczynski coat of arms
- Kopeć coat of arms
- Kopeć III coat of arms
- Koprowski coat of arms
- Kopycki coat of arms
- Korab coat of arms
- Korab II coat of arms
- Korbolli coat of arms
- Korbutowski coat of arms
- Korczak coat of arms
- Korczak II coat of arms
- Korczak III coat of arms
- Korczak IV coat of arms
- Korczak V coat of arms
- Korczak VI coat of arms
- Korczak VII coat of arms
- Korczak VIII coat of arms
- Korczak IX coat of arms
- Korczyk coat of arms
- Korczynski coat of arms
- Kord coat of arms
- Kordysz coat of arms
- Korff coat of arms
- Korkwicz coat of arms
- Korn coat of arms
- Kornic coat of arms
- Kornicz coat of arms
- Kornicz II coat of arms
- Korona coat of arms
- Korona II coat of arms
- Korsak coat of arms
- Korsak II coat of arms
- Korsak V coat of arms
- Kort coat of arms
- Korth coat of arms
- Korticzella coat of arms
- Kortum coat of arms
- Korun coat of arms
- Korwin coat of arms
- Korwin II coat of arms
- Korwin III coat of arms
- Koryatowicz coat of arms
- Koryatowicz-Kurcewicz coat of arms
- Korybut coat of arms
- Korybut II coat of arms
- Korybut III coat of arms
- Koryca coat of arms
- Korycki coat of arms
- Korytowski coat of arms
- Korytynski coat of arms
- Koryzna coat of arms
- Korzbok coat of arms
- Korzbok II coat of arms
- Korzbok III coat of arms
- Korzeniowski coat of arms
- Korzun coat of arms
- Kos coat of arms
- Kos II coat of arms
- Kos III coat of arms
- Kosa coat of arms
- Kosarzewski coat of arms
- Koscielec coat of arms
- Koscielski coat of arms
- Koscielski II coat of arms
- Kosicki coat of arms
- Kosiński coat of arms
- Koskul coat of arms
- Kosmas coat of arms
- Kosmowski coat of arms
- Kosnicki coat of arms
- Kosow coat of arms
- Kospot coat of arms
- Kossakowski coat of arms
- Kossowski coat of arms
- Kossowski II coat of arms
- Kossut coat of arms
- Kossut II coat of arms
- Kostecki coat of arms
- Kostka coat of arms
- Kostka II coat of arms
- Kostrowiec coat of arms
- Kostrowiec II coat of arms
- Kostrowski coat of arms
- Kostrzebski coat of arms
- Kosy coat of arms
- Koszanski coat of arms
- Koszarski coat of arms
- Koszczyc coat of arms
- Koszembar coat of arms
- Koszycki coat of arms
- Kościesza coat of arms
- Kościesza II coat of arms
- Kościesza III coat of arms
- Kościesza IV coat of arms
- Kościesza V coat of arms
- Kościesza VI coat of arms
- Kościesza Kuszaba coat of arms
- Kot coat of arms
- Kot II coat of arms
- Kot Morski coat of arms
- Kotarpski coat of arms
- Kotarski coat of arms
- Kotaszewicz coat of arms
- Kotlubaj coat of arms
- Kotlubicki coat of arms
- Kotulinski coat of arms
- Kotwica coat of arms
- Kotwica II coat of arms
- Kotwicz coat of arms
- Kotwicz II coat of arms
- Kotwicz III coat of arms
- Kotwicz IV coat of arms
- Kowal coat of arms
- Kowalek coat of arms
- Kowalk coat of arms
- Kowalski coat of arms
- Kowanko coat of arms
- Kowanski coat of arms
- Kownacki coat of arms
- Kownia coat of arms
- Kownia II coat of arms
- Kownia III coat of arms
- Kozar coat of arms
- Kozel coat of arms
- Koziczkowski coat of arms
- Koziczkowski II coat of arms
- Koziebrodzki coat of arms
- Koziel coat of arms
- Koziel II coat of arms
- Kozietulski coat of arms
- Kozika coat of arms
- Koziński coat of arms
- Koziński II coat of arms
- Koziulicz coat of arms
- Kozlowski coat of arms
- Kozlowski IV coat of arms
- Kozlowski IVa coat of arms
- Koźlakowski coat of arms
- Krajewski coat of arms
- Krajewski II coat of arms
- Krakau coat of arms
- Krakowczyk coat of arms
- Krakowiecki coat of arms
- Kralicz coat of arms
- Krasicki coat of arms
- Krasiński coat of arms
- Krasiński II coat of arms
- Krasiński III coat of arms
- Krasniewski coat of arms
- Krasnodębski coat of arms
- Kratter coat of arms
- Kraus coat of arms
- Krauze coat of arms
- Kreczyk coat of arms
- Kreczynski coat of arms
- Krejc coat of arms
- Krejc II coat of arms
- Krekwicz coat of arms
- Kremer coat of arms
- Kręcki coat of arms
- Kręcki II coat of arms
- Kręski coat of arms
- Krociusz coat of arms
- Krociusz II coat of arms
- Kroczewski coat of arms
- Kroje coat of arms
- Kroje II coat of arms
- Kroje III coat of arms
- Krokiew coat of arms
- Krokowski coat of arms
- Krokowski II coat of arms
- Krokowski III coat of arms
- Krokowski IV coat of arms
- Krokowski V coat of arms
- Krokowski VI coat of arms
- Krolikiewicz coat of arms
- Krolodar coat of arms
- Kromer coat of arms
- Kromer II coat of arms
- Kromer III coat of arms
- Kromno coat of arms
- Kronauge coat of arms
- Kronenberg coat of arms
- Kronwald coat of arms
- Kropacz coat of arms
- Kropiwa coat of arms
- Krosnowski coat of arms
- Krosnowski II coat of arms
- Krosta coat of arms
- Kroszyński coat of arms
- Królikowski coat of arms
- Krucina coat of arms
- Krucini coat of arms
- Krucini II coat of arms
- Krukowiecki coat of arms
- Krukowski coat of arms
- Krukowski II coat of arms
- Krukowski III coat of arms
- Krumes coat of arms
- Kruniewicz coat of arms
- Krupianski coat of arms
- Krupicki coat of arms
- Krupka coat of arms
- Krupocki coat of arms
- Krupocki II coat of arms
- Kruposiej coat of arms
- Kruszowski coat of arms
- Kruszyna coat of arms
- Krutta coat of arms
- Kruze coat of arms
- Kruzer coat of arms
- Krybelli coat of arms
- Krycini coat of arms
- Krydener coat of arms
- Kryg coat of arms
- Krygel coat of arms
- Kryger coat of arms
- Krygier coat of arms
- Krygshaber coat of arms
- Krygstein coat of arms
- Krygsztejn coat of arms
- Krynicki coat of arms
- Krynicki II coat of arms
- Krynicki III coat of arms
- Kryszpin coat of arms
- Kryweczki coat of arms
- Krzanowski coat of arms
- Krzczonowicz coat of arms
- Krzeczkowski coat of arms
- Krzeczunowicz coat of arms
- Krzepicki coat of arms
- Krzyczewski coat of arms
- Krzyczewski II coat of arms
- Krzystallowicz coat of arms
- Krzyszkowski coat of arms
- Krzysztofowicz coat of arms
- Krzywda coat of arms
- Krzywda II coat of arms
- Krzywdzic coat of arms
- Krzywicki coat of arms
- Krzywkowski coat of arms
- Krzyz V coat of arms
- Krzyz VIII coat of arms
- Krzyz IX coat of arms
- Krzyz IIX coat of arms
- Krzyz XI coat of arms
- Krzyzak coat of arms
- Krzyzanowski coat of arms
- Krzyzanowski II coat of arms
- Krzyzanowski III coat of arms
- Krzyzanowski IV coat of arms
- Krzyzanowski V coat of arms
- Krzyzanski coat of arms
- Krzyzluk coat of arms
- Krzyzluk II coat of arms
- Krzyzoroz coat of arms
- Krzyzowiec coat of arms
- Krzyżostrzał coat of arms
- Ksiezarski coat of arms
- Księżyc coat of arms
- Księżyc II coat of arms
- Kubala coat of arms
- Kubin coat of arms
- Kubitkiewicz coat of arms
- Kublicki coat of arms
- Kublicki II coat of arms
- Kuchowicz coat of arms
- Kuciejewski coat of arms
- Kuczborski coat of arms
- Kuczera coat of arms
- Kuczkowski coat of arms
- Kuczkowski coat of arms
- Kudrewicz coat of arms
- Kudrys coat of arms
- Kujawa coat of arms
- Kujawski coat of arms
- Kujk coat of arms
- Kukowski coat of arms
- Kuksz coat of arms
- Kulakowski coat of arms
- Kulikowski coat of arms
- Kulminski coat of arms
- Kulpiński coat of arms
- Kulzimanowicz coat of arms
- Kułak coat of arms
- Kumanowski coat of arms
- Kummer coat of arms
- Kuna coat of arms
- Kuna II coat of arms
- Kunatowicz coat of arms
- Kunicki coat of arms
- Kunicki II coat of arms
- Kuniglis coat of arms
- Kunowski coat of arms
- Kur coat of arms
- Kur II coat of arms
- Kurcyusz coat of arms
- Kurcz coat of arms
- Kurella coat of arms
- Kurkowski coat of arms
- Kurnatowski coat of arms
- Kuropatnicki coat of arms
- Kurowski coat of arms
- Kursel coat of arms
- Kurylo coat of arms
- Kurzeniec coat of arms
- Kusienicki coat of arms
- Kusza coat of arms
- Kusza II coat of arms
- Kusza III coat of arms
- Kuszaba coat of arms
- Kuszaba II coat of arms
- Kuszaba III coat of arms
- Kuszaba IV coat of arms
- Kutrel coat of arms
- Kutrowski coat of arms
- Kuznicki coat of arms
- Kweisser coat of arms
- Kwiatkowski coat of arms
- Kwiatkowski II coat of arms
- Kwiatkowski III coat of arms
- Kwilecki coat of arms
- Kykieryc coat of arms
- Kysielowski coat of arms

=== L ===
- Labenski coat of arms
- Labor coat of arms
- Labun coat of arms
- Lachnicki coat of arms
- Lachnitt coat of arms
- Lachowicki coat of arms
- Lacyozy coat of arms
- Lada III coat of arms
- Lada IV coat of arms
- Lagoda III coat of arms
- Lakowski coat of arms
- Lamar coat of arms
- Lanckoroński coat of arms
- Landsberg coat of arms
- Landszaft coat of arms
- Lang coat of arms
- Lange coat of arms
- Langen coat of arms
- Langenau coat of arms
- Langurga coat of arms
- Lapa coat of arms
- Larisch coat of arms
- Larski coat of arms
- Larysza coat of arms
- Larysza VII coat of arms
- Larzak coat of arms
- Laska coat of arms
- Laskarys coat of arms
- Laskawski coat of arms
- Laski coat of arms
- Laskiewicz coat of arms
- Lasocki coat of arms
- Laszenko coat of arms
- Latalski coat of arms
- Laudanski coat of arms
- Laurans coat of arms
- Lausson coat of arms
- Laveau coat of arms
- Lawrowski coat of arms
- Lazarewicz coat of arms
- Lazowski coat of arms
- Lazur coat of arms
- Lebel coat of arms
- Leben coat of arms
- Leczyslaw coat of arms
- Ledóchowski coat of arms
- Legendorf coat of arms
- Leibschang coat of arms
- Leitsch coat of arms
- Lekna coat of arms
- Lekno coat of arms
- Lekno II coat of arms
- Lelewel coat of arms
- Leliwa coat of arms
- Leliwa II coat of arms
- Leliwa III coat of arms
- Leliwa IV coat of arms
- Leliwa V coat of arms
- Leliwa VI coat of arms
- Leliwin coat of arms
- Lemanski coat of arms
- Lemke coat of arms
- Lemke II coat of arms
- Lemnicki coat of arms
- Lemnicki II coat of arms
- Lempicki coat of arms
- Lenkiewicz coat of arms
- Leo coat of arms
- Leparski coat of arms
- Lepieski coat of arms
- Lerchenfeld coat of arms
- Lesczynski coat of arms
- Lesieniewicz coat of arms
- Leski coat of arms
- Leski II coat of arms
- Leski III coat of arms
- Leskiewicz coat of arms
- Lesniewski coat of arms
- Lesniowski coat of arms
- Lessel coat of arms
- Lesser coat of arms
- Lesseur coat of arms
- Lestwicz coat of arms
- Leszcz coat of arms
- Leszczyc coat of arms
- Leszczyc III coat of arms
- Leszczyński coat of arms
- Leszczyński II coat of arms
- Lesznowski coat of arms
- Leszynski coat of arms
- Letaw coat of arms
- Letaw II coat of arms
- Lew coat of arms
- Lew II coat of arms
- Lew III coat of arms
- Lew IV coat of arms
- Lew V coat of arms
- Lew VI coat of arms
- Lew VII coat of arms
- Lew VIII coat of arms
- Lew IX coat of arms
- Lew z Laurami coat of arms
- Lew z Tarczą coat of arms
- Lew Złoty coat of arms
- Lewald coat of arms
- Lewalt coat of arms
- Lewalt II coat of arms
- Lewandowski coat of arms
- Lewanidow coat of arms
- Lewart coat of arms
- Lewart II coat of arms
- Lewart III coat of arms
- Lewartowski coat of arms
- Lewicki coat of arms
- Lewicki II coat of arms
- Lewicki III coat of arms
- Lewiecki coat of arms
- Lewiński coat of arms
- Lewiński II coat of arms
- Lewiński III coat of arms
- Lewiński IV coat of arms
- Lewiński V coat of arms
- LewIX coat of arms
- Lewkowicz coat of arms
- Ley coat of arms
- Lgocki coat of arms
- Lica coat of arms
- Lichocki coat of arms
- Lichtfus coat of arms
- Lichtyan coat of arms
- Lichtyan III coat of arms
- Liczbiński coat of arms
- Lidl coat of arms
- Ligura coat of arms
- Lilia coat of arms
- Lilie coat of arms
- Liliorog coat of arms
- Lill coat of arms
- Limont coat of arms
- Limożeńczyk coat of arms
- Linda coat of arms
- Linde coat of arms
- Lindenowski coat of arms
- Lingenau coat of arms
- Linhardt coat of arms
- Liniewicz coat of arms
- Liniewski coat of arms
- Liniewski II coat of arms
- Linkiewicz coat of arms
- Lipczewski coat of arms
- Lipin coat of arms
- Lipiński coat of arms
- Lipiński II coat of arms
- Lipiński III coat of arms
- Lipiński IV coat of arms
- Lipiński V coat of arms
- Lipiński VI coat of arms
- Lipowski coat of arms
- Lipowski II coat of arms
- Lippa coat of arms
- Lipski coat of arms
- Lipski II coat of arms
- Lis coat of arms
- Lis II coat of arms
- Lis IV coat of arms
- Lis V coat of arms
- Lis VII coat of arms
- Lisewski coat of arms
- Lisicki coat of arms
- Liskowski coat of arms
- Lisohub coat of arms
- Lisowidzki coat of arms
- Lisowski coat of arms
- Lisowski II coat of arms
- Lisowski III coat of arms
- Lissowski coat of arms
- Listowski coat of arms
- Listowski II coat of arms
- Liszen coat of arms
- Litewski coat of arms
- Litwan coat of arms
- Litynski coat of arms
- Liwen coat of arms
- Liwingston coat of arms
- Lizander coat of arms
- Lniski coat of arms
- Loboda coat of arms
- Lochman coat of arms
- Lochtowski coat of arms
- Locki coat of arms
- Lode coat of arms
- Lodzian coat of arms
- Lodziata coat of arms
- Loebl coat of arms
- Loewenstein coat of arms
- Lojowski coat of arms
- Loka coat of arms
- Lokczy coat of arms
- Lomikowski coat of arms
- Loncki coat of arms
- Loncki II coat of arms
- Londygier coat of arms
- Longschamp coat of arms
- Lopatacki coat of arms
- Losa coat of arms
- Lostin coat of arms
- Lotarynczyk coat of arms
- Louis coat of arms
- Lowczynski coat of arms
- Lowejko coat of arms
- Loza coat of arms
- Luberadzki coat of arms
- Lubianowski coat of arms
- Lubiatowski coat of arms
- Lubicz coat of arms
- Lubicz II coat of arms
- Lubicz III coat of arms
- Lubicz IV coat of arms
- Lubicz V coat of arms
- Lubicz VI coat of arms
- Lubiczobra coat of arms
- Lubieniec coat of arms
- Lubieniecki coat of arms
- Lubienski II coat of arms
- Lubliniec coat of arms
- Lubocki coat of arms
- Lubomirski coat of arms
- Lubowla coat of arms
- Lubowski coat of arms
- Luchtowski coat of arms
- Ludwig coat of arms
- Ludzisko coat of arms
- Lueger coat of arms
- Lukaszewicz coat of arms
- Lukawiecki coat of arms
- Lukianski coat of arms
- Lukina coat of arms
- Lukomski II coat of arms
- Lukomski III coat of arms
- Lumaszewski coat of arms
- Lunnow coat of arms
- Lupus coat of arms
- Lurenski coat of arms
- Lutomski coat of arms
- Lutostanski coat of arms
- Lutowski coat of arms
- Lutynski coat of arms
- Luziański coat of arms
- Luzinski coat of arms
- Luzowski coat of arms
- Lwoserd coat of arms
- Lwy coat of arms
- Lyro coat of arms
- Lysienko coat of arms
- Lyskowski coat of arms
- Lyzynski coat of arms

=== Ł ===
- Łabędzik coat of arms
- Łabędziogrot coat of arms
- Łabędź coat of arms
- Łada coat of arms
- Łagoda coat of arms
- Łasko coat of arms
- Łącki coat of arms
- Łącki II coat of arms
- Łączyński coat of arms
- Łączyński II coat of arms
- Łebiński coat of arms
- Łebiński II coat of arms
- Łętowski coat of arms
- Łętowski III coat of arms
- Łętowski IV coat of arms
- Łodzia coat of arms
- Łopot coat of arms
- Łosiatyński coat of arms
- Łosień coat of arms
- Łosowicz coat of arms
- Łoś coat of arms
- Łubieński coat of arms
- Łuk coat of arms
- Łuk i trzy strzały coat of arms
- Łukocz coat of arms
- Łukomski coat of arms
- Łyszczyński coat of arms
- Łyśniewski coat of arms

=== M ===
- Macenko coat of arms
- Macewicz coat of arms
- Macewicz II coat of arms
- Mach coat of arms
- Mach II coat of arms
- Mach III coat of arms
- Machajlo coat of arms
- Macharzynski coat of arms
- Machna coat of arms
- Machnicki coat of arms
- Machowski coat of arms
- Machwicz coat of arms
- Machwicz II coat of arms
- Mackiewicz coat of arms
- Mackowicz coat of arms
- Madan de Magura coat of arms
- Madrzejowski coat of arms
- Magieln coat of arms
- Magierowski coat of arms
- Majdel coat of arms
- Majkiewicz coat of arms
- Makowiecki coat of arms
- Makowski coat of arms
- Makowski II coat of arms
- Maksymowicz coat of arms
- Malechinski coat of arms
- Malek coat of arms
- Malewicz coat of arms
- Malikbasza coat of arms
- Malinkowski coat of arms
- Malinoszewski coat of arms
- Malski coat of arms
- Malszycki II coat of arms
- Maltin coat of arms
- Maltzan coat of arms
- Maltzan II coat of arms
- Małachowski coat of arms
- Małszycki coat of arms
- Mamleczewicz coat of arms
- Mandywel coat of arms
- Manget coat of arms
- Maniewski coat of arms
- Manikowski coat of arms
- Mankowski coat of arms
- Manowarda coat of arms
- Manowski coat of arms
- Mansch coat of arms
- Manteuffel coat of arms
- Manteuffel II coat of arms
- Manteuffel III coat of arms
- Manteuffel IV coat of arms
- Manuczy coat of arms
- Marassé coat of arms
- Marchesini coat of arms
- Marcinczyk coat of arms
- Marcinkowski coat of arms
- Maricius coat of arms
- Marischler coat of arms
- Mark coat of arms
- Markiewicz coat of arms
- Markiewicz II coat of arms
- Marklowski coat of arms
- Marklowski II coat of arms
- Markowicz coat of arms
- Markowski coat of arms
- Mars coat of arms
- Martynowicz coat of arms
- Maruniak coat of arms
- Marynowski coat of arms
- Marzecki coat of arms
- Masalski coat of arms
- Masalski II coat of arms
- Masalski III coat of arms
- Masalki IV coat of arms
- Masalski V coat of arms
- Masalski VI coat of arms
- Maskiewicz coat of arms
- Massow coat of arms
- Maszalski coat of arms
- Maszewa coat of arms
- Maszewski coat of arms
- Maszkiewicz coat of arms
- Matajewicz coat of arms
- Materna coat of arms
- Matijewicz coat of arms
- Matuszewicz coat of arms
- Matuszewicz II coat of arms
- Maty coat of arms
- Mauthner coat of arms
- Mazepa coat of arms
- Mazewski coat of arms
- Mazurkowicz coat of arms
- Mądrostki coat of arms
- Mądrostki II coat of arms
- Mądry coat of arms
- Mąkierski coat of arms
- Meck coat of arms
- Meissner coat of arms
- Mejer coat of arms
- Mejna coat of arms
- Mekarski coat of arms
- Meldzynski coat of arms
- Melecki coat of arms
- Meleszko coat of arms
- Melik coat of arms
- Melin coat of arms
- Meling coat of arms
- Melioruci coat of arms
- Melisa coat of arms
- Merawy coat of arms
- Mercan coat of arms
- Mersberg coat of arms
- Meszczeryn coat of arms
- Metejko coat of arms
- Metrocharite coat of arms
- Metych coat of arms
- Meyer coat of arms
- Mezyk coat of arms
- Męciński coat of arms
- Męk coat of arms
- Mianowski coat of arms
- Miaskowski coat of arms
- Miączyński coat of arms
- Michalowski II coat of arms
- Michalowski III coat of arms
- Michalski coat of arms
- Michalski II coat of arms
- Michałowski coat of arms
- Michelson coat of arms
- Michorowski coat of arms
- Mickulitsch coat of arms
- Micowski coat of arms
- Mieczoslaw coat of arms
- Mielzynski coat of arms
- Mienkowski coat of arms
- Mienta coat of arms
- Mier coat of arms
- Mier II coat of arms
- Mier Hrabia coat of arms
- Mierczynski coat of arms
- Miernik coat of arms
- Mieroslawski coat of arms
- Mieroszewski coat of arms
- Mieroszowski coat of arms
- Mierzejewski coat of arms
- Miesiac coat of arms
- Mietelski coat of arms
- Mięszaniec coat of arms
- Mikan coat of arms
- Miklaszewski coat of arms
- Mikorski coat of arms
- Mikuc coat of arms
- Mikulicz coat of arms
- Mikulinski coat of arms
- Milan coat of arms
- Milatynski coat of arms
- Milberg coat of arms
- Milberg II coat of arms
- Milewski coat of arms
- Milewski II coat of arms
- Milewski III coat of arms
- Milheim coat of arms
- Miliński coat of arms
- Milkowski II coat of arms
- Milkuschitz coat of arms
- Milkuschitz II coat of arms
- Miller coat of arms
- Milnheim coat of arms
- Milodar coat of arms
- Miloszewicz coat of arms
- Milowicz coat of arms
- Miłkowski coat of arms
- Miłydar coat of arms
- Miłżecki coat of arms
- Minasiewicz coat of arms
- Minasowicz coat of arms
- Minbulatowicz coat of arms
- Minbulatowicz II coat of arms
- Minkowski coat of arms
- Mioduszewski coat of arms
- Mirbach coat of arms
- Mirecki coat of arms
- Miris coat of arms
- Miron coat of arms
- Mironienko coat of arms
- Mirowicki coat of arms
- Mirski coat of arms
- Mises coat of arms
- Misiewski coat of arms
- Miszczenko coat of arms
- Mitkiewicz coat of arms
- Mitscha coat of arms
- Mittelstaedt coat of arms
- Mlodecki coat of arms
- Młodkowski coat of arms
- Młotek coat of arms
- Mniszech coat of arms
- Mniszech coat of arms
- Mniszek coat of arms
- Mocarski coat of arms
- Mochnacki coat of arms
- Mocki coat of arms
- Modlibog coat of arms
- Modlkowski coat of arms
- Modrzewski coat of arms
- Modrzewski II coat of arms
- Modzela coat of arms
- Modzelowski coat of arms
- Mogila II coat of arms
- Mogilewski coat of arms
- Mogilnicki coat of arms
- Mogiła coat of arms
- Mohl coat of arms
- Mohr coat of arms
- Mohyła coat of arms
- Mojsiej coat of arms
- Mokranski coat of arms
- Mokrzewski coat of arms
- Moldenhawer coat of arms
- Molencki coat of arms
- Moller coat of arms
- Molsdorf coat of arms
- Moncz coat of arms
- Monkiewicz coat of arms
- Monkiewicz II coat of arms
- Montelupi coat of arms
- Montelupi II coat of arms
- Montowt coat of arms
- Montowt II coat of arms
- Montrezor coat of arms
- Montygajlo coat of arms
- Mora coat of arms
- Mora III coat of arms
- Morawicki coat of arms
- Morawicki II coat of arms
- Morawski coat of arms
- Morawski II coat of arms
- Morenda coat of arms
- Morgenstern coat of arms
- Moritz coat of arms
- Morochowski coat of arms
- Morozewicz coat of arms
- Morski coat of arms
- Morsztyn coat of arms
- Morteski coat of arms
- Morycow coat of arms
- Morykoni coat of arms
- Morzkowski coat of arms
- Mosalski coat of arms
- Mosch coat of arms
- Mosiewicz coat of arms
- Mosing coat of arms
- Mosing II coat of arms
- Mossakowski coat of arms
- Mostowski coat of arms
- Moszczeński coat of arms
- Moszewski coat of arms
- Moszoro coat of arms
- Moszyński coat of arms
- Mowszan coat of arms
- Moysa coat of arms
- Mozerko coat of arms
- Mravinciscs coat of arms
- Mroczek coat of arms
- Mrozinski coat of arms
- Mscigniew coat of arms
- Mściszewski coat of arms
- Mściszewski II coat of arms
- Mściszowski coat of arms
- Muchla coat of arms
- Muller coat of arms
- Muller II coat of arms
- Muller III coat of arms
- Muller IV coat of arms
- Multan coat of arms
- Munkenbek coat of arms
- Murdelio coat of arms
- Muryson coat of arms
- Murzynowski coat of arms
- Musiata coat of arms
- Musnicki coat of arms
- Musnicki II coat of arms
- Mussil coat of arms
- Muszczynski coat of arms
- Muszynski coat of arms
- Mycielski coat of arms
- Mynasowicz coat of arms
- Mysleniec coat of arms
- Myslicki coat of arms
- Myslikowski coat of arms
- Myszkowski coat of arms
- Myszkowski II coat of arms
- Myszynski coat of arms
- Mytkowicz coat of arms

=== N ===
- Nabiałek coat of arms
- Nabram coat of arms
- Nachtigal coat of arms
- Nachtraba coat of arms
- Nackowicz coat of arms
- Nadarzynski coat of arms
- Nadelwicz coat of arms
- Nadram coat of arms
- Nadzieja coat of arms
- Nagórski coat of arms
- Nagroda coat of arms
- Nagroda II coat of arms
- Nagrododar coat of arms
- Nagurski coat of arms
- Nagurski II coat of arms
- Nahlik coat of arms
- Nahlik II coat of arms
- Nakaskach coat of arms
- Nalepa coat of arms
- Nalewka coat of arms
- Nałęcz coat of arms
- Nałęcz II coat of arms
- Nałęcz III coat of arms
- Nałęcz IV coat of arms
- Nałęcz V coat of arms
- Namiot coat of arms
- Namiot II coat of arms
- Namiot III coat of arms
- Napadiewicz coat of arms
- Napiwon coat of arms
- Napiwon II coat of arms
- Napolski coat of arms
- Narbut coat of arms
- Narebski coat of arms
- Naroznicki coat of arms
- Naruszewicz coat of arms
- Narutowicz coat of arms
- Narutowicz II coat of arms
- Narutowicz III coat of arms
- Narzymski coat of arms
- Nas coat of arms
- Nas II coat of arms
- Natalis coat of arms
- Natarcz coat of arms
- Natarcz II coat of arms
- Nawlicki coat of arms
- Nawoj coat of arms
- Nawrocki coat of arms
- Neborowski coat of arms
- Nechay coat of arms
- Nechwedkowicz coat of arms
- Necz coat of arms
- Nefedowicz coat of arms
- Nehring coat of arms
- Nejsztad coat of arms
- Nemethy coat of arms
- Nencha coat of arms
- Nenneke coat of arms
- Neodik coat of arms
- Nesterowicz coat of arms
- Nestorowicz coat of arms
- Neuhauser coat of arms
- Neumann coat of arms
- Newelski coat of arms
- Newlin coat of arms
- Newlin II coat of arms
- Nibszyc coat of arms
- Nicz coat of arms
- Nicze coat of arms
- Niebodar coat of arms
- Nieborowski coat of arms
- Nieczaj coat of arms
- Nieczuja coat of arms
- Nieczuja II coat of arms
- Nieczuja III coat of arms
- Nieczuja IV coat of arms
- Nieczuja V coat of arms
- Nieczuja VI coat of arms
- Nieczuła coat of arms
- Niedzwiedz coat of arms
- Niedzwiedzialy coat of arms
- Niedźwiedź Biały coat of arms
- Niedźwiedź Czarny coat of arms
- Niekrasz coat of arms
- Nieksinski coat of arms
- Niemajewski coat of arms
- Niemczyk coat of arms
- Niemirzyc coat of arms
- Niemojewski coat of arms
- Niemyski coat of arms
- Niemyski II coat of arms
- Niemyski III coat of arms
- Niepoczołowski coat of arms
- Niesobia coat of arms
- Niesobia II coat of arms
- Niesobia III coat of arms
- Niesobia IV coat of arms
- Niesten coat of arms
- Nieswicki coat of arms
- Nieszkowski coat of arms
- Nieszyjka coat of arms
- Niewiadomski coat of arms
- Niewiadomski II coat of arms
- Niewiadomski III coat of arms
- Niewiarowski coat of arms
- Niezgoda coat of arms
- Niezgoda II coat of arms
- Nikorowicz coat of arms
- Niszcz coat of arms
- Niwinski coat of arms
- Noga coat of arms
- Nonnart coat of arms
- Nosadyni coat of arms
- Nostitz coat of arms
- Nostitz II coat of arms
- Nowak coat of arms
- Nowak II coat of arms
- Nowakowski coat of arms
- Nowakowski II coat of arms
- Nowakowski III coat of arms
- Nowakowski IV coat of arms
- Nowicki coat of arms
- Nowicki II coat of arms
- Nowicz coat of arms
- Nowina coat of arms
- Nowinaowa coat of arms
- Nowosielecki coat of arms
- Nozdra coat of arms
- Nycz coat of arms
- Nycz II coat of arms

=== O ===
- Obolonski coat of arms
- Obrona coat of arms
- Obyrn coat of arms
- Ocetkiewicz coat of arms
- Ochabski coat of arms
- Ochocki coat of arms
- Ochtzim coat of arms
- Odachowski coat of arms
- Oderski coat of arms
- Oderski II coat of arms
- Oderski III coat of arms
- Odojewski coat of arms
- Odonel coat of arms
- Odrowąs coat of arms
- Odrowąż coat of arms
- Odrowąż II coat of arms
- Odrowąż III coat of arms
- Odrowski coat of arms
- Odsiecz coat of arms
- Odwaga coat of arms
- Odwaga II coat of arms
- Odwaga III coat of arms
- Odwaga IV coat of arms
- Odyniec coat of arms
- Odyniec II coat of arms
- Odyniec III coat of arms
- Oechsner coat of arms
- Ogigel coat of arms
- Ogiński coat of arms
- Ogończyk coat of arms
- Ogończyk II coat of arms
- Ogończyk III coat of arms
- Ogrodowicz coat of arms
- Ohanowicz coat of arms
- Oheral coat of arms
- Okminski coat of arms
- Okminski III coat of arms
- Okno coat of arms
- Okolski coat of arms
- Okrasinski coat of arms
- Oksza coat of arms
- Oksza II coat of arms
- Okulicz coat of arms
- Okuń coat of arms
- Okwietko coat of arms
- Olawa coat of arms
- Oleski coat of arms
- Oleszkowski coat of arms
- Olkuski coat of arms
- Olszer coat of arms
- Olszewski coat of arms
- Olszewski II coat of arms
- Olszewski III coat of arms
- Olszewski IV coat of arms
- Olszewski V coat of arms
- Olszewski VI coat of arms
- Olszewski VII coat of arms
- Olsznic coat of arms
- Olszowski coat of arms
- Om coat of arms
- Omanzof coat of arms
- Omiecinski coat of arms
- Ominski coat of arms
- Onyszkiewicz coat of arms
- Opacki coat of arms
- Opekowski coat of arms
- Opelewski coat of arms
- Opitz coat of arms
- Oppersdorff coat of arms
- Oracz coat of arms
- Oranowski coat of arms
- Oranski coat of arms
- Orda coat of arms
- Orez coat of arms
- Orla coat of arms
- Orla II coat of arms
- Orlik coat of arms
- Orlikowski coat of arms
- Orlikowski II coat of arms
- Orlikowski III coat of arms
- Orloslaw coat of arms
- Orlowski coat of arms
- Orlowski II coat of arms
- Orszulski coat of arms
- Orwal coat of arms
- Orzechowski coat of arms
- Osek coat of arms
- Osek III coat of arms
- Oseki coat of arms
- Oseki II coat of arms
- Osiecimski coat of arms
- Osiecimski-Hutten-Czapski coat of arms
- Osipowski coat of arms
- Oskierka coat of arms
- Oslawski coat of arms
- Oslawski II coat of arms
- Osmolowski coat of arms
- Osmolski coat of arms
- Osowski coat of arms
- Ossoliński coat of arms
- Ossoliński II coat of arms
- Ossoria coat of arms
- Ossorya coat of arms
- Ossorya II coat of arms
- Ossowski coat of arms
- Ostachowski coat of arms
- Ostaszewski coat of arms
- Ostelecki coat of arms
- Osten coat of arms
- Ostenaken coat of arms
- Ostermann coat of arms
- Ostermann II coat of arms
- Ostoja coat of arms
- Ostoja coat of arms
- Ostoja II coat of arms
- Ostojczyk coat of arms
- Ostroga coat of arms
- Ostrogski coat of arms
- Ostrogski II coat of arms
- Ostromiecz coat of arms
- Ostroróg coat of arms
- Ostroróg II coat of arms
- Ostroróg III coat of arms
- Ostrowski coat of arms
- Ostrowski II coat of arms
- Ostrowski III coat of arms
- Ostrozecki coat of arms
- Ostrynski coat of arms
- Ostrzec coat of arms
- Oswiata coat of arms
- Oszczewski coat of arms
- Oszyk coat of arms
- Oszyk II coat of arms
- Oteniowski coat of arms
- Otocki coat of arms
- Otroszczenko coat of arms
- Owada coat of arms
- Owsienski coat of arms
- Owszarski coat of arms
- Ozarowski coat of arms
- Ozarowski II coat of arms
- Ozdoba coat of arms
- Oziemblowski coat of arms
- Ozurewicz coat of arms

=== P ===
- Pac coat of arms
- Paciorkowski coat of arms
- Paczenski coat of arms
- Paczkowski coat of arms
- Pajaczkowski coat of arms
- Pakosz coat of arms
- Paksinski coat of arms
- Palkle coat of arms
- Palkowski coat of arms
- Palmitowski coat of arms
- Palmowski coat of arms
- Palmy coat of arms
- Pałubicki coat of arms
- Pałubicki II coat of arms
- Pałubicki III coat of arms
- Pałubicki IV coat of arms
- Pałubicki V coat of arms
- Pałuki coat of arms
- Pancer coat of arms
- Pancerz coat of arms
- Pankowski coat of arms
- Papara coat of arms
- Papara II coat of arms
- Papara III coat of arms
- Papini coat of arms
- Paplonski coat of arms
- Paraski coat of arms
- Paraski II coat of arms
- Parys coat of arms
- Pasch coat of arms
- Pasch II coat of arms
- Paschalski coat of arms
- Pasierb coat of arms
- Paskau coat of arms
- Paslaski coat of arms
- Pastorius coat of arms
- Pasuncki coat of arms
- Paszk coat of arms
- Paszk coat of arms
- Paszk II coat of arms
- Paszkiewicz coat of arms
- Paszkiewicz II coat of arms
- Paszkowski coat of arms
- Paszkowski II coat of arms
- Patek coat of arms
- Patkul coat of arms
- Pauffner coat of arms
- Pauleluf coat of arms
- Paulewicz coat of arms
- Paw coat of arms
- Pawelc coat of arms
- Pawels coat of arms
- Pawels II coat of arms
- Pawęza coat of arms
- Pawiniec coat of arms
- Pawlowicz coat of arms
- Pawlowicz II coat of arms
- Pawluc coat of arms
- Pawłowski coat of arms
- Pawłowski II coat of arms
- Pawłowski III coat of arms
- Pawłowski IV coat of arms
- Pawłowski V coat of arms
- Pawolocki coat of arms
- Pawsza coat of arms
- Pawsza II coat of arms
- Pażątka coat of arms
- Pażątka III coat of arms
- Pedzic coat of arms
- Pekawka coat of arms
- Pekoslaw coat of arms
- Pekoslaw II coat of arms
- Pelikan coat of arms
- Pelka coat of arms
- Pelka II coat of arms
- Pelken coat of arms
- Pelkowski coat of arms
- Peretyatkowicz coat of arms
- Pernet coat of arms
- Pernigotti coat of arms
- Pernus coat of arms
- Perot coat of arms
- Pestel coat of arms
- Petersen coat of arms
- Petrowski coat of arms
- Petru coat of arms
- Petryczy coat of arms
- Petrykowski coat of arms
- Petrykowski II coat of arms
- Petrykowski III coat of arms
- Petz coat of arms
- Pępowski coat of arms
- Pętkowski coat of arms
- Pfelsdorf coat of arms
- Phull coat of arms
- Piatkowski coat of arms
- Piechowski coat of arms
- Piechowski II coat of arms
- Pieciopior coat of arms
- Piecza coat of arms
- Pieczkowski coat of arms
- Pieczuga coat of arms
- Pielesz coat of arms
- Pielgrzym coat of arms
- Pielgrzymowski coat of arms
- Pielgrzymy coat of arms
- Pieniazek coat of arms
- Pierścień coat of arms
- Pierzcha coat of arms
- Pierzcha III coat of arms
- Pierzcha IV coat of arms
- Pierzchała coat of arms
- Piestnik coat of arms
- Pietrasiewicz coat of arms
- Pietrzycki coat of arms
- Pietrzyniec coat of arms
- Pietyrog coat of arms
- Pietyrog II coat of arms
- Pięta coat of arms
- Pikolar coat of arms
- Pilat coat of arms
- Pilat II coat of arms
- Pilawa coat of arms
- Pilchowski coat of arms
- Pilecki coat of arms
- Piliński coat of arms
- Piłsudski coat of arms
- Pindzewski coat of arms
- Piniński coat of arms
- Pinkas coat of arms
- Pinocki coat of arms
- Piora coat of arms
- Piora III coat of arms
- Pioro coat of arms
- Pioroslaw coat of arms
- Piotroch coat of arms
- Piotrowicz coat of arms
- Piotrowicz II coat of arms
- Piotrowicz III coat of arms
- Piotrowicz IV coat of arms
- Piotrowski coat of arms
- Piotrowski II coat of arms
- Piotrowski III coat of arms
- Piotrowski IV coat of arms
- Pirawski coat of arms
- Pisanski coat of arms
- Pisarzewski coat of arms
- Pisienski coat of arms
- Piszczanski coat of arms
- Piwnicki coat of arms
- Piwnicki II coat of arms
- Plaga coat of arms
- Plat coat of arms
- Plata coat of arms
- Plater coat of arms
- Plazek coat of arms
- Plecki coat of arms
- Plemiecki coat of arms
- Pleminski coat of arms
- Plenchow coat of arms
- Plesniewicz coat of arms
- Pleszkowski coat of arms
- Plochentz coat of arms
- Ploetz coat of arms
- Plon coat of arms
- Plonski coat of arms
- Plotowski coat of arms
- Pluskiewicz coat of arms
- Pluszczewski coat of arms
- Płachecki IV coat of arms
- Płochnicki coat of arms
- Płomioła coat of arms
- Płużyca coat of arms
- Pniejnia coat of arms
- Pobedzie coat of arms
- Pobłocki coat of arms
- Pobłocki II coat of arms
- Pobóg coat of arms
- Pobóg II coat of arms
- Pobóg III coat of arms
- Pochyly coat of arms
- Pociej coat of arms
- Pociej II coat of arms
- Pocisk coat of arms
- Poczernicki coat of arms
- Podbereski coat of arms
- Podbereski II coat of arms
- Podbereski III coat of arms
- Podbial coat of arms
- Podchocimski coat of arms
- Poddany coat of arms
- Podgórski coat of arms
- Podhajecki coat of arms
- Podjaski coat of arms
- Podjaski III coat of arms
- Podkowa coat of arms
- Podkowa II coat of arms
- Podkowa III coat of arms
- Podkowa IV coat of arms
- Podmichalski coat of arms
- Podoski coat of arms
- Podtepa coat of arms
- Podwinski coat of arms
- Poelt coat of arms
- Pogirski coat of arms
- Poglies coat of arms
- Poglodowski coat of arms
- Pogon coat of arms
- Pogon II coat of arms
- Pogonia coat of arms
- Pogonia II coat of arms
- Pogoń Litewska coat of arms
- Pogoń Litewska II coat of arms
- Pogoń Ruska coat of arms
- Podhorski coat of arms
- Pogorski coat of arms
- Pogorzelski coat of arms
- Pogorzelski II coat of arms
- Pogrel coat of arms
- Pogrom coat of arms
- Poklat coat of arms
- Pokora coat of arms
- Pokora II coat of arms
- Pokotylo coat of arms
- Pokroszynski coat of arms
- Pokrzywnicki coat of arms
- Pokrzywnicki II coat of arms
- Poktynski coat of arms
- Pol coat of arms
- Pola coat of arms
- Polanowski coat of arms
- Polanski coat of arms
- Polanski II coat of arms
- Polentz coat of arms
- Poletyka coat of arms
- Poletyło coat of arms
- Policzyński coat of arms
- Politkowski coat of arms
- Poliwczyński coat of arms
- Poljednorozec coat of arms
- Poll coat of arms
- Polonicki coat of arms
- Polow coat of arms
- Polowiecki coat of arms
- Polswiat coat of arms
- Polswiat II coat of arms
- Polubinski coat of arms
- Polubotek coat of arms
- Poluchowski coat of arms
- Połota coat of arms
- Pomian coat of arms
- Pomian II coat of arms
- Pomian III coat of arms
- Pomian IV coat of arms
- Pomiankowski coat of arms
- Pomiski coat of arms
- Pomyski coat of arms
- Ponetowski coat of arms
- Poniatowski coat of arms
- Poniński coat of arms
- Poniński coat of arms
- Ponyrko coat of arms
- Poplawski coat of arms
- Poplawski II coat of arms
- Poraj coat of arms
- Porebny coat of arms
- Porebski coat of arms
- Porembinski coat of arms
- Poronia coat of arms
- Portanty coat of arms
- Porwik coat of arms
- Posadowski coat of arms
- Posadowski II coat of arms
- Possinger coat of arms
- Postawka coat of arms
- Postel coat of arms
- Postep coat of arms
- Postolski coat of arms
- Postolski II coat of arms
- Posudziewski coat of arms
- Poswist coat of arms
- Potarzycki coat of arms
- Potega coat of arms
- Potega II coat of arms
- Potemkin coat of arms
- Poten coat of arms
- Potocki coat of arms
- Potocki II coat of arms
- Potocki III coat of arms
- Potoczki coat of arms
- Potulicki coat of arms
- Poturgi coat of arms
- Potworowski coat of arms
- Powaby coat of arms
- Powinski coat of arms
- Powolny coat of arms
- Powszyński coat of arms
- Poziomkiewicz coat of arms
- Poznanski coat of arms
- Pozorzycki coat of arms
- Pół Orła coat of arms
- Półkozic coat of arms
- Późniak coat of arms
- Późniak II coat of arms
- Prachtel coat of arms
- Pracobron coat of arms
- Pracomir coat of arms
- Pracoslaw coat of arms
- Pracotwor coat of arms
- Pracowoc coat of arms
- Pracydar coat of arms
- Prassa coat of arms
- Pratnicki coat of arms
- Praun coat of arms
- Prawda coat of arms
- Prawdzic coat of arms
- Prawdzic II coat of arms
- Prawita coat of arms
- Prawomian coat of arms
- Prawomir coat of arms
- Prawomysl coat of arms
- Prawosc coat of arms
- Prazewski coat of arms
- Praznorski coat of arms
- Prądzyński coat of arms
- Prądzyński II coat of arms
- Prądzyński III coat of arms
- Preiss coat of arms
- Prek coat of arms
- Prek II coat of arms
- Pressen coat of arms
- Pretlak coat of arms
- Pretorius coat of arms
- Pretwicz coat of arms
- Preuss coat of arms
- Preyten coat of arms
- Priesfield coat of arms
- Proboszczowski coat of arms
- Prokopowicz coat of arms
- Promnicz coat of arms
- Proszynski coat of arms
- Protasiewicz coat of arms
- Protasowicz coat of arms
- Prowana coat of arms
- Prozor coat of arms
- Prozor III coat of arms
- Prunkul coat of arms
- Prus coat of arms
- Prus II coat of arms
- Prus III coat of arms
- Pruszkowski coat of arms
- Pruszkowski III coat of arms
- Pruszynski coat of arms
- Przebendowski coat of arms
- Przeboj coat of arms
- Przebolowski coat of arms
- Przechocki coat of arms
- Przedwolszowski coat of arms
- Przeginia coat of arms
- Przegonia coat of arms
- Przemęcki coat of arms
- Przemyslomierz coat of arms
- Przerembski coat of arms
- Przerowa coat of arms
- Przestrzal II coat of arms
- Przestrzał coat of arms
- Przewoski coat of arms
- Przewoski II coat of arms
- Przewoziecki coat of arms
- Przezdziecki coat of arms
- Przosna coat of arms
- Przosna II coat of arms
- Przyborski coat of arms
- Przybylski coat of arms
- Przychocki coat of arms
- Przychocki II coat of arms
- Przyjaciel coat of arms
- Przyjaciel II coat of arms
- Przyjaciel III coat of arms
- Przyjaciel V coat of arms
- Przyjaciel VI coat of arms
- Przyjaciel VII coat of arms
- Przyjaciel IX coat of arms
- Przyjaciel XII coat of arms
- Przyjaciel XIII coat of arms
- Przyjeski coat of arms
- Przykorwin coat of arms
- Przysługa coat of arms
- Przytarski coat of arms
- Przywidzki coat of arms
- Pskowczyk coat of arms
- Psojecki coat of arms
- Pszyczyna coat of arms
- Puchacz coat of arms
- Puchala III coat of arms
- Puchalski coat of arms
- Puchała coat of arms
- Puciata coat of arms
- Puciata II coat of arms
- Pudłowski coat of arms
- Pudwels coat of arms
- Pudwels II coat of arms
- Pukalski coat of arms
- Pukszta coat of arms
- Pupart coat of arms
- Pupka coat of arms
- Pusch coat of arms
- Puslowski coat of arms
- Puszet coat of arms
- Putkamer coat of arms
- Putoszynski coat of arms
- Puttkammer coat of arms
- Puzyna coat of arms
- Pypka coat of arms
- Pyrszewski coat of arms
- Pyrys coat of arms

=== R ===
- Rab coat of arms
- Raba coat of arms
- Rabe coat of arms
- Rabiej coat of arms
- Racieski coat of arms
- Racki coat of arms
- Raczkowski coat of arms
- Raczkowski II coat of arms
- Raczyński coat of arms
- Radanowicz coat of arms
- Radański coat of arms
- Radecki coat of arms
- Radecki II coat of arms
- Radecki III coat of arms
- Raden coat of arms
- Radeslaw coat of arms
- Radke coat of arms
- Radlowski coat of arms
- Radneski coat of arms
- Radnicki coat of arms
- Radocki coat of arms
- Radolin coat of arms
- Radoliński coat of arms
- Radomski coat of arms
- Radoniski coat of arms
- Radoniski II coat of arms
- Radoniski III coat of arms
- Radonski coat of arms
- Radoszewski coat of arms
- Radoszynski coat of arms
- Radwan coat of arms
- Radwan V coat of arms
- Radwan VII coat of arms
- Radwan Sowity coat of arms
- Radynski coat of arms
- Radzic coat of arms
- Radzic II coat of arms
- Radzicki coat of arms
- Radziejowski coat of arms
- Radziemski coat of arms
- Radzilowski coat of arms
- Radziminski coat of arms
- Radziski coat of arms
- Radzisław coat of arms
- Radziwill III coat of arms
- Radziwiłł coat of arms
- Radziwiłł II coat of arms
- Radzki coat of arms
- Rafalowicz coat of arms
- Ragi coat of arms
- Ragocki coat of arms
- Rahoza coat of arms
- Raj coat of arms
- Rajecki coat of arms
- Rakoczy coat of arms
- Rakowski coat of arms
- Rakwicz coat of arms
- Ramel coat of arms
- Ramel II coat of arms
- Ramer coat of arms
- Ramm coat of arms
- Ramult II coat of arms
- Ramułt coat of arms
- Rap coat of arms
- Rapold coat of arms
- Rapoport coat of arms
- Rappe coat of arms
- Rappe II coat of arms
- Rarog coat of arms
- Rarowski coat of arms
- Rarowski II coat of arms
- Rarowski V coat of arms
- Ras coat of arms
- Ras II coat of arms
- Rastawiecki coat of arms
- Raszyc coat of arms
- Raszyniec coat of arms
- Ratułt coat of arms
- Rau coat of arms
- Rauten coat of arms
- Rautenberg coat of arms
- Rauter coat of arms
- Rawa coat of arms
- Rawa II coat of arms
- Rawicz coat of arms
- Rawicz II coat of arms
- Rayski coat of arms
- Rdultowski coat of arms
- Reber coat of arms
- Rebern coat of arms
- Rebinder coat of arms
- Rechowicz coat of arms
- Reckow coat of arms
- Redemin coat of arms
- Reder coat of arms
- Reder II coat of arms
- Redern coat of arms
- Redko coat of arms
- Regawski coat of arms
- Regman coat of arms
- Reibnitz coat of arms
- Reichard coat of arms
- Reisewitz I coat of arms
- Reisewitz II coat of arms
- Reiss coat of arms
- Rej coat of arms
- Rejman coat of arms
- Rejtan coat of arms
- Rek coat of arms
- Reka coat of arms
- Reka II coat of arms
- Rekowski coat of arms
- Rekowski II coat of arms
- Rekowski III coat of arms
- Rekowski IV coat of arms
- Rekowski V coat of arms
- Rekowski VI coat of arms
- Rekowski VII coat of arms
- Rekowski VIII coat of arms
- Rekowski IX coat of arms
- Rekowski X coat of arms
- Rekowski XI coat of arms
- Rekowski XII coat of arms
- Reksin coat of arms
- Rembowski coat of arms
- Rembowski II coat of arms
- Rembowski III coat of arms
- Remer coat of arms
- Renard coat of arms
- Renka coat of arms
- Renka II coat of arms
- Renne coat of arms
- Renne II coat of arms
- Repka coat of arms
- Repke coat of arms
- Reptowski coat of arms
- Resza coat of arms
- Reszka coat of arms
- Reverdil coat of arms
- Rewolinski coat of arms
- Rey coat of arms
- Rezwic coat of arms
- Rękomiecz coat of arms
- Rękopiór coat of arms
- Ringemuth coat of arms
- Riokur coat of arms
- Rittberg coat of arms
- Ritter coat of arms
- Robislaw coat of arms
- Roch coat of arms
- Roch II coat of arms
- Roch III coat of arms
- Roch IV coat of arms
- Rochcicki coat of arms
- Rochcicki II coat of arms
- Rodacki coat of arms
- Rodzianko coat of arms
- Rogala coat of arms
- Rogale coat of arms
- Rogaliński coat of arms
- Rogenbuk coat of arms
- Rogenpan coat of arms
- Rogijelen coat of arms
- Rogojski coat of arms
- Rogojski II coat of arms
- Rogowicz coat of arms
- Rohan coat of arms
- Rokiczana coat of arms
- Rokossowski coat of arms
- Rokossowski II coat of arms
- Rokosz coat of arms
- Rokotowski coat of arms
- Rokowiec coat of arms
- Rola coat of arms
- Rolaslaw coat of arms
- Rolbiecki coat of arms
- Rolbiecki II coat of arms
- Rolicz coat of arms
- Romanczenko coat of arms
- Romanowicz coat of arms
- Romaszkan coat of arms
- Romer coat of arms
- Romer coat of arms
- Ronikier coat of arms
- Ronow coat of arms
- Rosainski coat of arms
- Rosau coat of arms
- Rosbierski coat of arms
- Rosen coat of arms
- Roskau coat of arms
- Roskiewicz coat of arms
- Roskoszny coat of arms
- Roslawiec coat of arms
- Rossman coat of arms
- Rostek coat of arms
- Rostke coat of arms
- Rostke II coat of arms
- Rostken coat of arms
- Rostok coat of arms
- Rostok III coat of arms
- Rostworowski coat of arms
- Rosyniec coat of arms
- Rota coat of arms
- Rote coat of arms
- Rotenburg coat of arms
- Rotenburg II coat of arms
- Rotenhof coat of arms
- Rotenmund coat of arms
- Rotenmund II coat of arms
- Rotermund coat of arms
- Rottenmund coat of arms
- Rozaiala coat of arms
- Rozan coat of arms
- Rozan II coat of arms
- Rozana coat of arms
- Rozanowski coat of arms
- Rozdrazewski coat of arms
- Rozdrazewski II coat of arms
- Roze coat of arms
- Rozemberg coat of arms
- Rozemberg II coat of arms
- Rozen coat of arms
- Rozenkampf coat of arms
- Rozinski coat of arms
- Rozloniewski coat of arms
- Rozmiar coat of arms
- Rozopior coat of arms
- Rozstocki coat of arms
- Rozwadowski coat of arms
- Rozycki coat of arms
- Różyński coat of arms
- Różyński II coat of arms
- Rubach coat of arms
- Rubec coat of arms
- Rubicz coat of arms
- Rubiesz coat of arms
- Rubiesz II coat of arms
- Rucki coat of arms
- Rucki II coat of arms
- Rudecki coat of arms
- Rudecki II coat of arms
- Rudgis coat of arms
- Rudgis II coat of arms
- Rudnica coat of arms
- Rudnica II coat of arms
- Rudnicki coat of arms
- Rudnicki II coat of arms
- Rudnicki III coat of arms
- Rudnicki IV coat of arms
- Rudomina coat of arms
- Rudziec coat of arms
- Rukiet coat of arms
- Rumel coat of arms
- Rumianski coat of arms
- Ruminski coat of arms
- Runge coat of arms
- Runge II coat of arms
- Runo coat of arms
- Rupinski coat of arms
- Rus coat of arms
- Ruscinski coat of arms
- Rusecki coat of arms
- Rusin coat of arms
- Rusk coat of arms
- Ruslejski coat of arms
- Rusociński coat of arms
- Rusocki coat of arms
- Rusowicz coat of arms
- Russocki coat of arms
- Rustejko coat of arms
- Rutenberg coat of arms
- Ruter coat of arms
- Rutkowski coat of arms
- Rutkowski II coat of arms
- Rutowski coat of arms
- Ruzyczka coat of arms
- Rybczynski coat of arms
- Rybienski coat of arms
- Rybnic coat of arms
- Ryc coat of arms
- Ryc II coat of arms
- Rycerzoslaw coat of arms
- Rychlewski coat of arms
- Rychlicki coat of arms
- Rychlinski coat of arms
- Rychter coat of arms
- Rycz coat of arms
- Ryczgorski coat of arms
- Rydezel coat of arms
- Rydger coat of arms
- Rydger II coat of arms
- Rydger III coat of arms
- Rydygier coat of arms
- Rydynger coat of arms
- Rydzynski coat of arms
- Rygeman coat of arms
- Ryk coat of arms
- Ryks coat of arms
- Rymer coat of arms
- Ryp coat of arms
- Rysiewicz coat of arms
- Ryś coat of arms
- Ryś II coat of arms
- Ryś IV coat of arms
- Rytger III coat of arms
- Rywocki coat of arms
- Ryx coat of arms
- Rzeczycki coat of arms
- Rzepecki coat of arms
- Rzepicki coat of arms
- Rzepicki II coat of arms
- Rzepiszewski coat of arms
- Rzesinski coat of arms
- Rzetkowski coat of arms
- Rzewuski coat of arms
- Rzędzicz coat of arms
- Rzyszczewski coat of arms

=== S ===
- Saby coat of arms
- Sacher coat of arms
- Safarewicz coat of arms
- Sagramozo coat of arms
- Sagsewski coat of arms
- Sahanek coat of arms
- Sak coat of arms
- Saka coat of arms
- Sakowicz coat of arms
- Salamandra coat of arms
- Salawa coat of arms
- Salis coat of arms
- Salisz coat of arms
- Salisz II coat of arms
- Salomon coat of arms
- Salomon II coat of arms
- Sambor coat of arms
- Samojlowicz coat of arms
- Samoped coat of arms
- Samostrzelnik coat of arms
- Samowicz coat of arms
- Samplawski coat of arms
- Samson coat of arms
- Samsonowicz coat of arms
- Sanden coat of arms
- Sandrecki coat of arms
- Sanguszko coat of arms
- Sapieha coat of arms
- Sapieha II coat of arms
- Sapieha IV coat of arms
- Sapieha VIII coat of arms
- Sapucho coat of arms
- Sarbski coat of arms
- Sarnowski coat of arms
- Sartawski coat of arms
- Sartorius coat of arms
- Sas coat of arms
- Sas II coat of arms
- Sas III coat of arms
- Sas IV coat of arms
- Sas Pruski coat of arms
- Sasulicz coat of arms
- Sawa coat of arms
- Sawaniewski coat of arms
- Sawczynski coat of arms
- Sawicki coat of arms
- Sawicz coat of arms
- Sawracki coat of arms
- Sawur coat of arms
- Sawurski coat of arms
- Schabenbeck coat of arms
- Schabicki coat of arms
- Schaffgotsch coat of arms
- Schalec coat of arms
- Schau coat of arms
- Scheliha coat of arms
- Schelking coat of arms
- Schiling coat of arms
- Schiller coat of arms
- Schinbuhr coat of arms
- Schindler coat of arms
- Schlichting coat of arms
- Schlieffen coat of arms
- Schmeling coat of arms
- Schmid coat of arms
- Schmidt coat of arms
- Schmidt II coat of arms
- Schmieden coat of arms
- Schoenberg coat of arms
- Schoening coat of arms
- Schonborn coat of arms
- Schonert coat of arms
- Schouppe coat of arms
- Schrappfer coat of arms
- Schuller coat of arms
- Schulz coat of arms
- Schutz coat of arms
- Schutz II coat of arms
- Schweinichen coat of arms
- Schweinoch coat of arms
- Schymberg coat of arms
- Scypio coat of arms
- Seck coat of arms
- Secyminski coat of arms
- Sedziwoj coat of arms
- Seeguth coat of arms
- Seeguth II coat of arms
- Seeling coat of arms
- Seffler coat of arms
- Seidler coat of arms
- Sejfert coat of arms
- Sekowski coat of arms
- Selasinski coat of arms
- Seloft coat of arms
- Senniki coat of arms
- Sepia coat of arms
- Serce coat of arms
- Serda coat of arms
- Serecki coat of arms
- Seredkiewicz coat of arms
- Serny coat of arms
- Seronos coat of arms
- Sertz coat of arms
- Serwatowski coat of arms
- Sesing coat of arms
- Seydlitz coat of arms
- Sędzimir coat of arms
- Sępiec coat of arms
- Siatecki coat of arms
- Siedlecki coat of arms
- Siedlnicki coat of arms
- Siedmiogradzki coat of arms
- Siedmioracki coat of arms
- Siekacz coat of arms
- Siekierz coat of arms
- Siekierzyński coat of arms
- Sielawa coat of arms
- Sielechowski coat of arms
- Sielecki coat of arms
- Sielski coat of arms
- Sielunia coat of arms
- Siemaszko coat of arms
- Siemianowicz coat of arms
- Siemieński coat of arms
- Sieminski coat of arms
- Siemionowicz coat of arms
- Siemionowicz II coat of arms
- Sieniawski coat of arms
- Sienicki coat of arms
- Sieniuta coat of arms
- Sieniuta II coat of arms
- Siennicki coat of arms
- Sierakowski coat of arms
- Sierakowski coat of arms
- Sierakowski II coat of arms
- Sierawski coat of arms
- Sieroszewski coat of arms
- Sierpy coat of arms
- Siestrzeńcewicz coat of arms
- Sigert coat of arms
- Signio coat of arms
- Sikorski coat of arms
- Sikorski II coat of arms
- Sikorski III coat of arms
- Sikorski IV coat of arms
- Sikorski V coat of arms
- Silicz coat of arms
- Simolin coat of arms
- Simonowicz coat of arms
- Sinczekowicz coat of arms
- Singer coat of arms
- Singer II coat of arms
- Siracki coat of arms
- Sistowski coat of arms
- Skabiczewski coat of arms
- Skal coat of arms
- Skal II coat of arms
- Skarbek coat of arms
- Skarbicz coat of arms
- Skarbnik coat of arms
- Skarbomierz coat of arms
- Skarga coat of arms
- Skarga II coat of arms
- Skarzewski coat of arms
- Skarzynski coat of arms
- Skirmunt coat of arms
- Skoczowski coat of arms
- Skop coat of arms
- Skopowski coat of arms
- Skorecki coat of arms
- Skorobohaty coat of arms
- Skorowa coat of arms
- Skorpion coat of arms
- Skorski coat of arms
- Skorulski coat of arms
- Skorzewski coat of arms
- Skorzewski II coat of arms
- Skotnicki coat of arms
- Skowronski coat of arms
- Skowronski II coat of arms
- Skrbenski coat of arms
- Skrochowski coat of arms
- Skronski coat of arms
- Skronski II coat of arms
- Skrytomir coat of arms
- Skrzydlolot coat of arms
- Skrzyński coat of arms
- Skrzyszowski coat of arms
- Skumin coat of arms
- Skupiewski coat of arms
- Skwarczynski coat of arms
- Slawecin coat of arms
- Slawikowski coat of arms
- Sleczkowski coat of arms
- Slek coat of arms
- Sliwicki coat of arms
- Slominski coat of arms
- Slon II coat of arms
- Slonina coat of arms
- Sloninka coat of arms
- Sloninka II coat of arms
- Sluchowski coat of arms
- Sluczanowski coat of arms
- Slupy coat of arms
- Sluzbotwor coat of arms
- Sluzewski coat of arms
- Sławutowski coat of arms
- Słoń coat of arms
- Słońce coat of arms
- Słowieński coat of arms
- Słownik coat of arms
- Smaltockij coat of arms
- Smett coat of arms
- Smett II coat of arms
- Smietana coat of arms
- Smoczynski coat of arms
- Smolak coat of arms
- Smoluchowski coat of arms
- Smorczewski coat of arms
- Snop coat of arms
- Snop II coat of arms
- Snop III coat of arms
- Sobanski coat of arms
- Sobieski coat of arms
- Sobiwolski coat of arms
- Sobobolinski coat of arms
- Sobolewski coat of arms
- Sobotka coat of arms
- Sobowski coat of arms
- Sochaniewicz coat of arms
- Sojacinski coat of arms
- Sokol coat of arms
- Sokola coat of arms
- Sokola II coat of arms
- Sokolnicki coat of arms
- Sokolowski coat of arms
- Sokolowski II coat of arms
- Soldenhoff coat of arms
- Solecki coat of arms
- Solfa coat of arms
- Solomerecki coat of arms
- Solomin coat of arms
- Solski coat of arms
- Soltan II coat of arms
- Soltan IV coat of arms
- Soltyk II coat of arms
- Soltyk III coat of arms
- Sołtan coat of arms
- Sołtyk coat of arms
- Somkowicz coat of arms
- Somnicz coat of arms
- Sonsfeld coat of arms
- Sopocko coat of arms
- Soszycki coat of arms
- Sowa coat of arms
- Sowa II coat of arms
- Sowak coat of arms
- Sowinski coat of arms
- Spath coat of arms
- Spatschek coat of arms
- Spegawski coat of arms
- Spendowski coat of arms
- Spensberg coat of arms
- Spensberger coat of arms
- Spiczak coat of arms
- Spieczynski coat of arms
- Spielmann coat of arms
- Spiring coat of arms
- Splawa coat of arms
- Splawski coat of arms
- Sprengel coat of arms
- Springenburg coat of arms
- Sroczek coat of arms
- Sroczynski coat of arms
- Srzedzinski coat of arms
- Stablewski coat of arms
- Stablewski II coat of arms
- Stabrowski coat of arms
- Stach coat of arms
- Stadnicki coat of arms
- Stadnicki II coat of arms
- Stadnicki III coat of arms
- Stadnicki IV coat of arms
- Standerski coat of arms
- Stankar coat of arms
- Stankar II coat of arms
- Staratrzala coat of arms
- Starmer coat of arms
- Starogrodzki coat of arms
- Staropis coat of arms
- Starostka coat of arms
- Starykoń coat of arms
- Starzeński coat of arms
- Starzewski coat of arms
- Starzynski coat of arms
- Starzynski II coat of arms
- Stasiewicz coat of arms
- Staszewski coat of arms
- Staszk coat of arms
- Staszkiewicz coat of arms
- Staszkiewicz II coat of arms
- Staszkiewicz III coat of arms
- Stauden coat of arms
- Stawarski coat of arms
- Stawecki coat of arms
- Stawecki II coat of arms
- Stawicz coat of arms
- Stawinski coat of arms
- Stebnicki coat of arms
- Steckiewicz coat of arms
- Stefan coat of arms
- Stegmanski coat of arms
- Stelzhammer coat of arms
- Stencz coat of arms
- Stepanowicz coat of arms
- Steplowski coat of arms
- Stepski coat of arms
- Sternberg coat of arms
- Sterpinski coat of arms
- Sterpinski II coat of arms
- Steszewski coat of arms
- Stettner coat of arms
- Stezynski coat of arms
- Stiller coat of arms
- Stojanowicz coat of arms
- Stojentin coat of arms
- Stojeński coat of arms
- Stokalski coat of arms
- Stokowiecki coat of arms
- Stokowski coat of arms
- Stolle coat of arms
- Stolobot coat of arms
- Stolobot II coat of arms
- Stoma coat of arms
- Stopyr coat of arms
- Stosz coat of arms
- Strachocki coat of arms
- Strachowski coat of arms
- Strachwic coat of arms
- Stracz coat of arms
- Stradomski coat of arms
- Stranski coat of arms
- Straszewski coat of arms
- Straszynski coat of arms
- Straszynski II coat of arms
- Strauch coat of arms
- Straus coat of arms
- Straz coat of arms
- Strażnicki coat of arms
- Strobicz coat of arms
- Strocki coat of arms
- Stroic coat of arms
- Strojnowski coat of arms
- Strube coat of arms
- Strucki coat of arms
- Strugi coat of arms
- Strumillo coat of arms
- Strus coat of arms
- Struscinski coat of arms
- Strzalaam coat of arms
- Strzalad coat of arms
- Strzalakrzy coat of arms
- Strzalkowski coat of arms
- Strzała coat of arms
- Strzała II coat of arms
- Strzała III coat of arms
- Strzała IV coat of arms
- Strzała V coat of arms
- Strzała VI coat of arms
- Strzała VII coat of arms
- Strzała VIII coat of arms
- Strzałą VIII coat of arms
- Strzała IX coat of arms
- Strzała X coat of arms
- Strzała XI coat of arms
- Strzała XII coat of arms
- Strzała Skrzydlasta coat of arms
- Strzała Załamana coat of arms
- Strzała w Tuzinie coat of arms
- Strzałka coat of arms
- Strzegonia coat of arms
- Strzemienczyk coat of arms
- Strzemienski coat of arms
- Strzemię coat of arms
- Strzeszkowski coat of arms
- Strzyzowski coat of arms
- Studnicki coat of arms
- Stupaczewski coat of arms
- Sturm coat of arms
- Sturtzen coat of arms
- Stwolinski coat of arms
- Styczynski coat of arms
- Styks coat of arms
- Stylarski coat of arms
- Styp II coat of arms
- Suchekomnaty coat of arms
- Suchekomnaty III coat of arms
- Suchekomnaty IV coat of arms
- Suchodolski coat of arms
- Suchodolski II coat of arms
- Suchodolski III coat of arms
- Suchodolski IV coat of arms
- Sukowski coat of arms
- Sukowski II coat of arms
- Sukowski III coat of arms
- Sulicki coat of arms
- Sulicki II coat of arms
- Sulima coat of arms
- Suliski coat of arms
- Sultowski coat of arms
- Sułkowski coat of arms
- Sułkowski II coat of arms
- Sułkowski III coat of arms
- Suminski coat of arms
- Summer coat of arms
- Sumowski coat of arms
- Surgolewski coat of arms
- Suryn coat of arms
- Suryn II coat of arms
- Suszyński coat of arms
- Sutkiewicz coat of arms
- Sutocki coat of arms
- Swarozynski coat of arms
- Swaryczewski coat of arms
- Swarzynski coat of arms
- Swiat coat of arms
- Swiat II coat of arms
- Swiatecki coat of arms
- Swiatecki II coat of arms
- Swiecicki coat of arms
- Swiniarski coat of arms
- Swirkocin coat of arms
- Swirski coat of arms
- Swirski II coat of arms
- Swistelnicki coat of arms
- Swoszowski coat of arms
- Sydorok coat of arms
- Syksztyn coat of arms
- Sylm coat of arms
- Syrok coat of arms
- Syrokomla coat of arms
- Syrokomla II coat of arms
- Syrokomla XIV coat of arms
- Syrokomla XV coat of arms
- Szabla coat of arms
- Szablowinski coat of arms
- Szachlacki coat of arms
- Szachman coat of arms
- Szadlinski coat of arms
- Szadurski coat of arms
- Szafgocz coat of arms
- Szafonski coat of arms
- Szala coat of arms
- Szalaowina coat of arms
- Szaleski coat of arms
- Szaława coat of arms
- Szampach coat of arms
- Szaniawski coat of arms
- Szantyr coat of arms
- Szantyr II coat of arms
- Szarlinski coat of arms
- Szaszewicz coat of arms
- Szaszewski coat of arms
- Szaszkiewicz coat of arms
- Szatanski coat of arms
- Szauman coat of arms
- Szawłowski coat of arms
- Szczaplina coat of arms
- Szczepanowski coat of arms
- Szczepanski coat of arms
- Szczerbic coat of arms
- Szczeski coat of arms
- Szczodrowski coat of arms
- Szczucki coat of arms
- Szczytomir coat of arms
- Szczytynski coat of arms
- Szedzieński coat of arms
- Szeliga coat of arms
- Szeliga II coat of arms
- Szeliga III coat of arms
- Szeliga IV coat of arms
- Szeliga V coat of arms
- Szeliga VI coat of arms
- Szeliski coat of arms
- Szembek coat of arms
- Szembel coat of arms
- Szemiot coat of arms
- Szeparowicz coat of arms
- Szeps coat of arms
- Szeptycki coat of arms
- Szeptycki coat of arms
- Szerenos coat of arms
- Szerewicz coat of arms
- Szetenski coat of arms
- Szlachtowski coat of arms
- Szlachtowski II coat of arms
- Szlichta coat of arms
- Szlubowski coat of arms
- Szmakowski coat of arms
- Szmeling coat of arms
- Szoldrski coat of arms
- Szolkowski coat of arms
- Szorc coat of arms
- Szorfas coat of arms
- Szorfas II coat of arms
- Szpado coat of arms
- Szpady coat of arms
- Szpęgawski coat of arms
- Szpot coat of arms
- Szpot II coat of arms
- Szramczenko coat of arms
- Szranki coat of arms
- Szreder coat of arms
- Szreniawa coat of arms
- Szrok coat of arms
- Sztembart coat of arms
- Szukowicz coat of arms
- Szulc coat of arms
- Szulc II coat of arms
- Szuma coat of arms
- Szwajkowski coat of arms
- Szwarcwald coat of arms
- Szweykowski coat of arms
- Szydlowski II coat of arms
- Szydłowski coat of arms
- Szymanski coat of arms
- Szymiczek coat of arms
- Szymkowicz coat of arms
- Szymonowicz coat of arms
- Szymonowicz II coat of arms
- Szyna coat of arms
- Szynweski coat of arms
- Szypniewski coat of arms
- Szyraj coat of arms
- Szyrma coat of arms
- Szyrynski coat of arms
- Szystowski coat of arms
- Szyszko coat of arms
- Szywir coat of arms
- Śleporod coat of arms
- Świszczewski II coat of arms

=== Ś ===
- Ściborowicz coat of arms
- Ślepowron coat of arms
- Świchowski coat of arms
- Świchowski II coat of arms
- Świeńczyc coat of arms
- Świerczek coat of arms
- Świnka coat of arms
- Świszczewski coat of arms

=== T ===
- Tabor coat of arms
- Tabęcki coat of arms
- Tabora coat of arms
- Taczala II coat of arms
- Taczała coat of arms
- Taczanowski coat of arms
- Tada coat of arms
- Tada II coat of arms
- Tada III coat of arms
- Tadzinski coat of arms
- Talski coat of arms
- Taluszowicz coat of arms
- Tanajewski coat of arms
- Tanata coat of arms
- Tański coat of arms
- Tarak coat of arms
- Tarczala coat of arms
- Tarma coat of arms
- Tarmen coat of arms
- Tarnawa coat of arms
- Tarnawiecki coat of arms
- Tarnawski coat of arms
- Tarnawski II coat of arms
- Tarnowski coat of arms
- Tarnowski II coat of arms
- Tarwid coat of arms
- Taube coat of arms
- Taylor coat of arms
- Tchórzowski coat of arms
- Tchórzowski II coat of arms
- Teczynski coat of arms
- Tehlowski coat of arms
- Tekurzewski coat of arms
- Telatycki coat of arms
- Telatycki II coat of arms
- Tempski coat of arms
- Tepa coat of arms
- Tepa II coat of arms
- Tepa III coat of arms
- Tepfer coat of arms
- Tepper coat of arms
- Terajewicz coat of arms
- Terebesz coat of arms
- Terlecki coat of arms
- Terlica coat of arms
- Terpilowski coat of arms
- Tesmar coat of arms
- Tesmar II coat of arms
- Tesmer coat of arms
- Tessen coat of arms
- Tettmayer coat of arms
- Teuffel coat of arms
- Tępa Podkowa coat of arms
- Thalau coat of arms
- Thanhauser coat of arms
- Thun coat of arms
- Till coat of arms
- Tilly coat of arms
- Titz coat of arms
- Tiuzma coat of arms
- Tluchowski coat of arms
- Tochtomyszewicz coat of arms
- Tocki coat of arms
- Tojpin coat of arms
- Tokarski coat of arms
- Toloczkowicz coat of arms
- Tolwinski coat of arms
- Tołoczko coat of arms
- Tomara coat of arms
- Tomkowicz coat of arms
- Tonniges coat of arms
- Topacz coat of arms
- Topiczewski coat of arms
- Topór coat of arms
- Topór II coat of arms
- Topór III coat of arms
- Topór IV coat of arms
- Topór V coat of arms
- Topór odmienny coat of arms
- Torczylo coat of arms
- Towencin coat of arms
- Towtko coat of arms
- Towucki coat of arms
- Trach coat of arms
- Trach II coat of arms
- Trach III coat of arms
- Traczobron coat of arms
- Tragurio coat of arms
- Traubenberg coat of arms
- Trąby coat of arms
- Trąby II coat of arms
- Trąby III coat of arms
- Trebnicki coat of arms
- Trebnitz coat of arms
- Trecki coat of arms
- Trembiński coat of arms
- Tresler coat of arms
- Trestka coat of arms
- Treter coat of arms
- Treutler coat of arms
- Trexler coat of arms
- Trleski coat of arms
- Trnka coat of arms
- Trocki coat of arms
- Trockiieniut coat of arms
- Troczynski coat of arms
- Trojanowski coat of arms
- Trojański coat of arms
- Trojgwiazd coat of arms
- Trojnicki coat of arms
- Trojstrzal II coat of arms
- Troska coat of arms
- Troska II coat of arms
- Troska III coat of arms
- Trójstrzał coat of arms
- Truchanow coat of arms
- Trupia coat of arms
- Trupia Głowa coat of arms
- Trusiewicz coat of arms
- Trybel coat of arms
- Tryncza coat of arms
- Tryumf coat of arms
- Tryzna coat of arms
- Trzaska coat of arms
- Trzaska II coat of arms
- Trzcieński coat of arms
- Trzciniec coat of arms
- Trzebiński coat of arms
- Trzebiński II coat of arms
- Trzeciak coat of arms
- Trzecieski coat of arms
- Trzemeski coat of arms
- Trzesiewski coat of arms
- Trzy Buławy coat of arms
- Trzy Gwiazdy coat of arms
- Trzy Kawki coat of arms
- Trzy Kotwice coat of arms
- Trzy Tarcze coat of arms
- Trzy Wilki coat of arms
- Trzyeby coat of arms
- Trzyulawy coat of arms
- Trzywdar coat of arms
- Trzywdar II coat of arms
- Tuchan coat of arms
- Tuchołka coat of arms
- Tuczynski coat of arms
- Tumanski coat of arms
- Turkul coat of arms
- Turkul II coat of arms
- Turlaj coat of arms
- Turnau coat of arms
- Turno coat of arms
- Turski coat of arms
- Turznicki coat of arms
- Turzo coat of arms
- Turzynski coat of arms
- Turzynski II coat of arms
- Tuwszowicz coat of arms
- Twardost coat of arms
- Twardzicki coat of arms
- Tyba coat of arms
- Tykowicz coat of arms
- Tyszewicz coat of arms
- Tyszkiewicz coat of arms

=== U ===
- Uherski coat of arms
- Ukolicz coat of arms
- Ukolow coat of arms
- Ulan coat of arms
- Ulan II coat of arms
- Ulanicki coat of arms
- Ulanicki II coat of arms
- Ulina coat of arms
- Uliński coat of arms
- Ulrich coat of arms
- Ulrich II coat of arms
- Umiastowski coat of arms
- Unczowski coat of arms
- Unierzycki coat of arms
- Unrug coat of arms
- Urbanicki coat of arms
- Urbanski coat of arms
- Uruski coat of arms
- Ustarbowski coat of arms
- Uszacki coat of arms
- Uszacki II coat of arms
- Utratowski coat of arms

=== V ===
- Vogesack coat of arms
- Voigt coat of arms
- Von Roggenhausen coat of arms

=== W ===
- Waborkowski coat of arms
- Wachtel coat of arms
- Wadkowski coat of arms
- Wadwicz coat of arms
- Wadwicz II coat of arms
- Waga coat of arms
- Waga II coat of arms
- Waga III coat of arms
- Wagner coat of arms
- Wagner II coat of arms
- Wagner III coat of arms
- Wakowski coat of arms
- Waksman coat of arms
- Walbach coat of arms
- Walczewski coat of arms
- Waldstein coat of arms
- Walentino coat of arms
- Walewski coat of arms
- Walewski II coat of arms
- Walkiewicz coat of arms
- Walknicz coat of arms
- Wankowicz coat of arms
- Wankowicz II coat of arms
- Wapiński coat of arms
- Wargowski coat of arms
- Warkowski coat of arms
- Warlowski coat of arms
- Warnia coat of arms
- Warnia II coat of arms
- Warnsdorf coat of arms
- Warzewski coat of arms
- Waselrot coat of arms
- Wasilewski coat of arms
- Wasilewski II coat of arms
- Wasilewski III coat of arms
- Waskiewicz coat of arms
- Watlewski coat of arms
- Wąglikowski coat of arms
- Wąż coat of arms
- Wąż II coat of arms
- Wąż III coat of arms
- Wąż IV coat of arms
- Wąż V coat of arms
- Wąż VI coat of arms
- Wczele coat of arms
- Wdzięczność coat of arms
- Weber coat of arms
- Weber II coat of arms
- Weclawowicz coat of arms
- Wedelse coat of arms
- Wedrychowski coat of arms
- Wegierski coat of arms
- Wegner coat of arms
- Wegrzecki coat of arms
- Wegrzynowicz coat of arms
- Weicher coat of arms
- Weidenthal coat of arms
- Weinling coat of arms
- Weiss coat of arms
- Weiss II coat of arms
- Weissmann coat of arms
- Wejher coat of arms
- Welinowicz coat of arms
- Wencki coat of arms
- Wenda coat of arms
- Went coat of arms
- Wenturelli coat of arms
- Werden coat of arms
- Werenko coat of arms
- Werona coat of arms
- Weselini coat of arms
- Wesoła coat of arms
- Weyde coat of arms
- Weyss coat of arms
- Wezemborg coat of arms
- Wezyk coat of arms
- Węgier coat of arms
- Węsierski coat of arms
- Węsierski IV coat of arms
- Węsierski VI coat of arms
- Węsierski VII coat of arms
- Wichert coat of arms
- Wichulski coat of arms
- Wicken coat of arms
- Wicon coat of arms
- Wiczliński coat of arms
- Widejko coat of arms
- Widmann coat of arms
- Wiecki coat of arms
- Wieckowski coat of arms
- Wieckowski II coat of arms
- Wieczwinski coat of arms
- Wieczwinski II coat of arms
- Wiekowicz coat of arms
- Wielhorski coat of arms
- Wieliczkowski coat of arms
- Wielistowski coat of arms
- Wielkołucki coat of arms
- Wielopolski coat of arms
- Wielowiejski coat of arms
- Wielowieyski coat of arms
- Wielozynski coat of arms
- Wieniawa coat of arms
- Wieniawa II coat of arms
- Wieniawa III coat of arms
- Wienskowski coat of arms
- Wiernik coat of arms
- Wiersza coat of arms
- Wieruszowa coat of arms
- Wierzbna coat of arms
- Wierzbna II coat of arms
- Wierzchlejski coat of arms
- Wierzchowski coat of arms
- Wierzejewski coat of arms
- Wiesiołowski coat of arms
- Wietcki coat of arms
- Wietcki II coat of arms
- Wieże coat of arms
- Wieże II coat of arms
- Wieże III coat of arms
- Wieże IV coat of arms
- Wieże V coat of arms
- Wieże VI coat of arms
- Wigura coat of arms
- Wik coat of arms
- Wilamowicz coat of arms
- Wilcza coat of arms
- Wilczek coat of arms
- Wilczek II coat of arms
- Wilczek III coat of arms
- Wilczewski coat of arms
- Wilkaniec coat of arms
- Wilkowic coat of arms
- Wilmowski coat of arms
- Winkler coat of arms
- Wipplar coat of arms
- Wipplar II coat of arms
- Wiranowski coat of arms
- Wirbski coat of arms
- Wirpsza coat of arms
- Wirsewinski coat of arms
- Wirydarski coat of arms
- Wiśniewski coat of arms
- Wiśniewski II coat of arms
- Wiśniewski III coat of arms
- Witk coat of arms
- Witk II coat of arms
- Witk III coat of arms
- Witk IV coat of arms
- Witk V coat of arms
- Witkowski coat of arms
- Witoszynski coat of arms
- Wittan coat of arms
- Witte coat of arms
- Witte II coat of arms
- Wittke coat of arms
- Wittke II coat of arms
- Wizemberg coat of arms
- Wladyslawski coat of arms
- Wlasnosil coat of arms
- Wloszek II coat of arms
- Włocki coat of arms
- Włoszek coat of arms
- Wnuk coat of arms
- Wnuk II coat of arms
- Wnuk-Czapiewski coat of arms
- Wobeser coat of arms
- Woda coat of arms
- Wodanowski coat of arms
- Wodoradzki coat of arms
- Wodzicki coat of arms
- Wodzicki coat of arms
- Wojanowski coat of arms
- Wojciechowicz coat of arms
- Wojewodzki coat of arms
- Wojeyko coat of arms
- Wojkowski coat of arms
- Wojkowski II coat of arms
- Wojna coat of arms
- Wojnilowicz II coat of arms
- Wojniłowicz coat of arms
- Wojno coat of arms
- Wojnowski coat of arms
- Wojski coat of arms
- Wojszko coat of arms
- Wojszyk coat of arms
- Wokurka coat of arms
- Wokurka II coat of arms
- Wolański coat of arms
- Wolański II coat of arms
- Wolcki coat of arms
- Wolczynski coat of arms
- Wolda coat of arms
- Wolf coat of arms
- Wolf II coat of arms
- Wolf III coat of arms
- Wolf IV coat of arms
- Wolf V coat of arms
- Wolfarth coat of arms
- Wolff coat of arms
- Wolfram coat of arms
- Wolha coat of arms
- Wollowicz coat of arms
- Wolnicki coat of arms
- Wolnosc coat of arms
- Wolodkowicz coat of arms
- Wolodkowicz II coat of arms
- Wolski coat of arms
- Wolszlegier coat of arms
- Wołkowyski coat of arms
- Wołoszynowski coat of arms
- Wonson coat of arms
- Worcell coat of arms
- Woronczenko coat of arms
- Woroniec coat of arms
- Woroniecki coat of arms
- Woronowicz coat of arms
- Woropaj coat of arms
- Wosinski coat of arms
- Wostrowski coat of arms
- Woyciechowski coat of arms
- Woyciechowski II coat of arms
- Woyna coat of arms
- Woynarowicz coat of arms
- Woynarowicz II coat of arms
- Woyszko coat of arms
- Wrana coat of arms
- Wranski coat of arms
- Wranski II coat of arms
- Wroblewski coat of arms
- Wroblowski coat of arms
- Wrochem coat of arms
- Wronski coat of arms
- Wrycz coat of arms
- Wrycza coat of arms
- Wtorkowski coat of arms
- Wukry coat of arms
- Wussow coat of arms
- Wydra coat of arms
- Wyhowski coat of arms
- Wyhowski II coat of arms
- Wyhowski III coat of arms
- Wykisialy coat of arms
- Wysocki coat of arms
- Wysocki II coat of arms
- Wyssogota coat of arms
- Wyssogota II coat of arms
- Wyszgirt coat of arms
- Wyszpolski coat of arms
- Wyszyński coat of arms
- Wyszyński II coat of arms

=== Y ===
- Yorck von Wartenburg coat of arms
- Younga coat of arms

=== Z ===
- Zaba coat of arms
- Zabawa coat of arms
- Zabawa II coat of arms
- Zabielski coat of arms
- Zabiełło coat of arms
- Zabka coat of arms
- Zabka II coat of arms
- Zablocki coat of arms
- Zaborowski coat of arms
- Zachariasiewicz coat of arms
- Zachariewicz coat of arms
- Zachert coat of arms
- Zadora coat of arms
- Zagajewski coat of arms
- Zagłoba coat of arms
- Zajaczek coat of arms
- Zajerski coat of arms
- Zak coat of arms
- Zakobielski coat of arms
- Zakrzewski coat of arms
- Zakrzewski II coat of arms
- Zakrzewski III coat of arms
- Zaleski coat of arms
- Zaleski II coat of arms
- Zaleski IV coat of arms
- Zalski coat of arms
- Załuski coat of arms
- Zambrowski coat of arms
- Zamecki coat of arms
- Zamłyński coat of arms
- Zamorski coat of arms
- Zamory coat of arms
- Zamoyski coat of arms
- Zamoyski II coat of arms
- Zander coat of arms
- Zanelli coat of arms
- Zanke coat of arms
- Zankowski coat of arms
- Zapendowski coat of arms
- Zapędowski coat of arms
- Zarebski coat of arms
- Zarecki coat of arms
- Zaremba coat of arms
- Zaremba II coat of arms
- Zarnow coat of arms
- Zarzecki coat of arms
- Zarzycki coat of arms
- Zastrow coat of arms
- Zasulicz coat of arms
- Zatajony coat of arms
- Zatajony II coat of arms
- Zatajony Miesiąc coat of arms
- Zawada coat of arms
- Zawadzki coat of arms
- Zawadzki II coat of arms
- Zawadzki III coat of arms
- Zaworowicz coat of arms
- Zbaraski coat of arms
- Zbigniewicz coat of arms
- Zbiświcz coat of arms
- Zbiświcz II coat of arms
- Zbiświcz III coat of arms
- Zbiświcz IV coat of arms
- Zboinski coat of arms
- Zborowski coat of arms
- Zborowski II coat of arms
- Zborowski III coat of arms
- Zborowski IV coat of arms
- Zborowski V coat of arms
- Zbrozek coat of arms
- Zdan coat of arms
- Zdanowicz coat of arms
- Zdanski coat of arms
- Zdanski II coat of arms
- Zdanski III coat of arms
- Zegartowski coat of arms
- Zeidler coat of arms
- Zelslawski coat of arms
- Zemsta coat of arms
- Zerwikaptur coat of arms
- Zet coat of arms
- Zetynian coat of arms
- Zeydel coat of arms
- Zęby coat of arms
- Zgoda coat of arms
- Zgraja coat of arms
- Zielenski coat of arms
- Zieloński coat of arms
- Ziemialkowski coat of arms
- Ziemięcki coat of arms
- Ziemięcki II coat of arms
- Zienkowicz coat of arms
- Zientarski coat of arms
- Zientecki coat of arms
- Zierowski coat of arms
- Zierowski II coat of arms
- Zietarski coat of arms
- Zietkiewicz coat of arms
- Zimmer coat of arms
- Zimowicz coat of arms
- Zinke coat of arms
- Zinten coat of arms
- Zitzewitz coat of arms
- Ziwny coat of arms
- Zlota coat of arms
- Zlotarz coat of arms
- Zlotobelki coat of arms
- Zlotogolenczyk coat of arms
- Zlotorowicz coat of arms
- Zlotoryb coat of arms
- Zlotorzek coat of arms
- Zlotowaz coat of arms
- Zlotowaz II coat of arms
- Zlotowlos coat of arms
- Złosz coat of arms
- Złota Wolność coat of arms
- Złotokłos coat of arms
- Złotowski coat of arms
- Zmiącki coat of arms
- Znin coat of arms
- Zoll coat of arms
- Zoltowski coat of arms
- Zopowski coat of arms
- Zoraw coat of arms
- Zozenow coat of arms
- Zrazewski coat of arms
- Zunger coat of arms
- Zuzanski coat of arms
- Zweytinger coat of arms
- Zwinogrodzki coat of arms
- Zwislocki coat of arms
- Zwolski coat of arms
- Zyberk coat of arms
- Zygadlowicz coat of arms
- Zygadlowicz II coat of arms
- Zynarowicz coat of arms
- Zyngulec coat of arms
- Zyniew coat of arms
- Zywert coat of arms
- Zyzemski coat of arms

=== Ż ===
- Żaliński coat of arms
- Żaliński II coat of arms
- Żaliński III coat of arms
- Żarowski coat of arms
- Żądłowski coat of arms
- Żebrowski coat of arms
- Żebrowski-Frącz coat of arms
- Żelaziński coat of arms
- Żeleński coat of arms
- Żelewski coat of arms
- Żelewski II coat of arms
- Żelewski III coat of arms
- Żelewski IV coat of arms
- Żelewski V coat of arms
- Żelewski VI coat of arms
- Żeromski coat of arms
- Żeromski coat of arms
- Żeromski II coat of arms
- Żmuda coat of arms
- Żmuda II coat of arms
- Żmuda III coat of arms
- Żmudzki coat of arms
- Żukowski coat of arms
- Żukowski II coat of arms
- Żychcki coat of arms
- Żychliński coat of arms
- Życiński coat of arms
- Żyliński coat of arms

== Images of some Polish-Lithuanian clan coat of arms ==
Herb Rzeczpospolitej Obojga Narodow

Herb Abdank (Awdaniec)

Herb Achinger

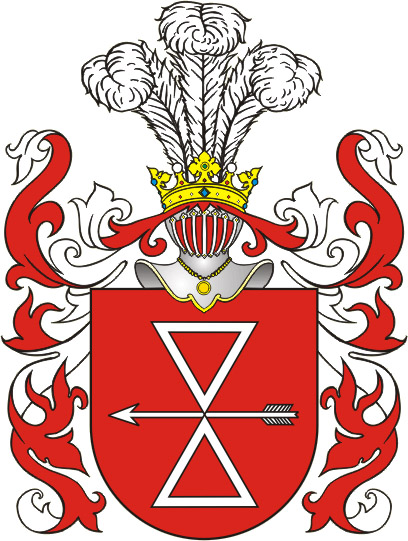
Herb Aksak

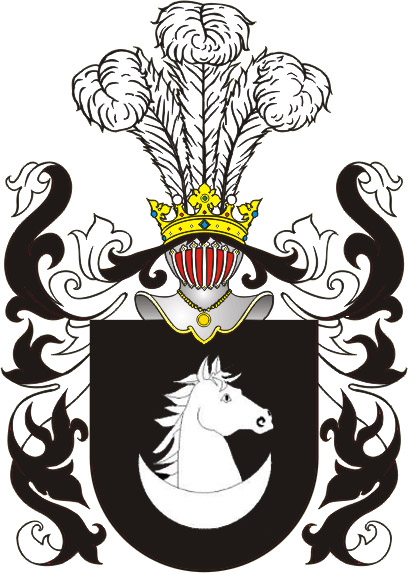
Herb Alabanda

Herb Allan

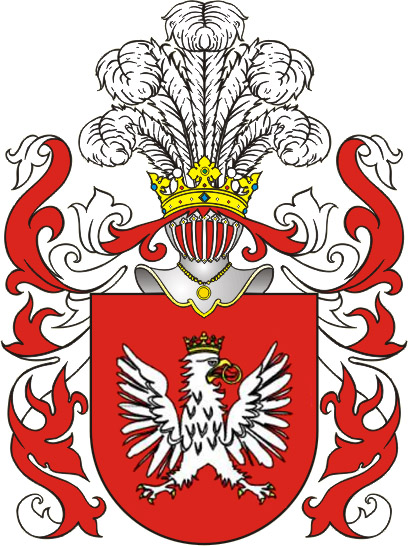
Herb Amadej

Herb Antoniewicz

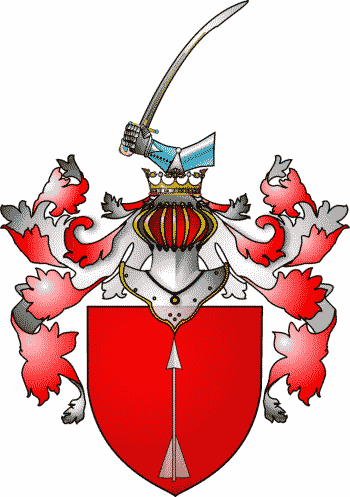
Herb Azulewicz

Herb Bajbuza

Herb Bawola-Głowa

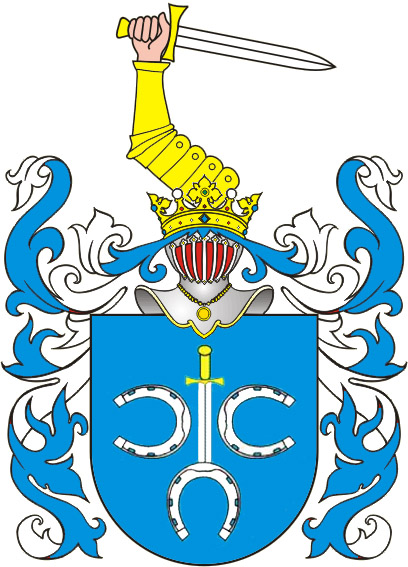
Herb Belina

Herb Bełty

Herb Beztrwogi

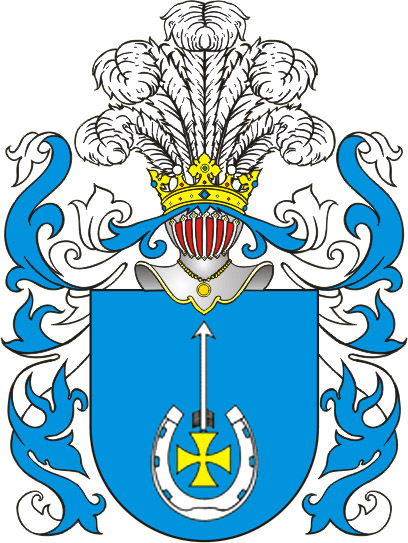
Herb Białynia

Herb Biberstein

Herb Boenisch

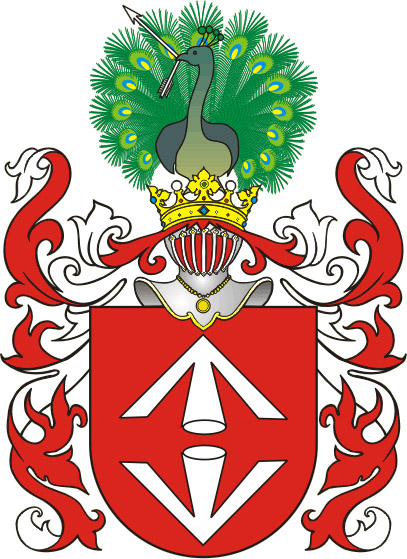
Herb Bogorya (Bogoria)

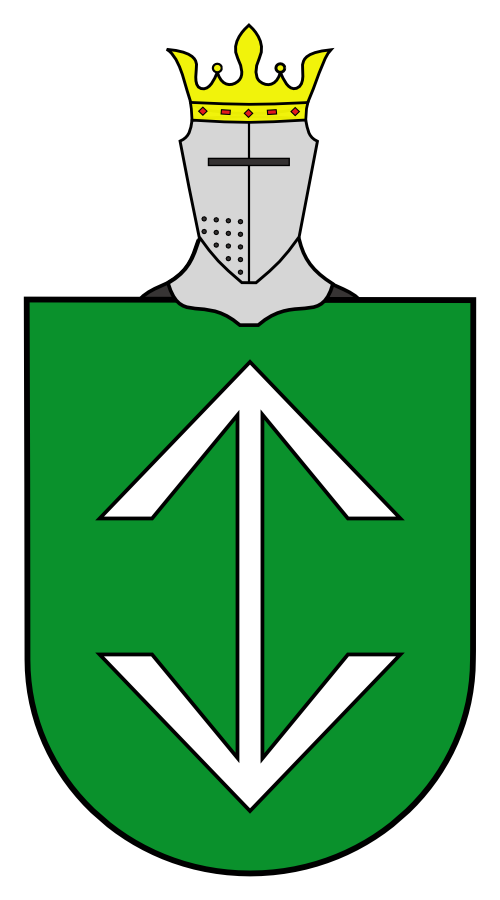
Herb Bogoria, odmiana II

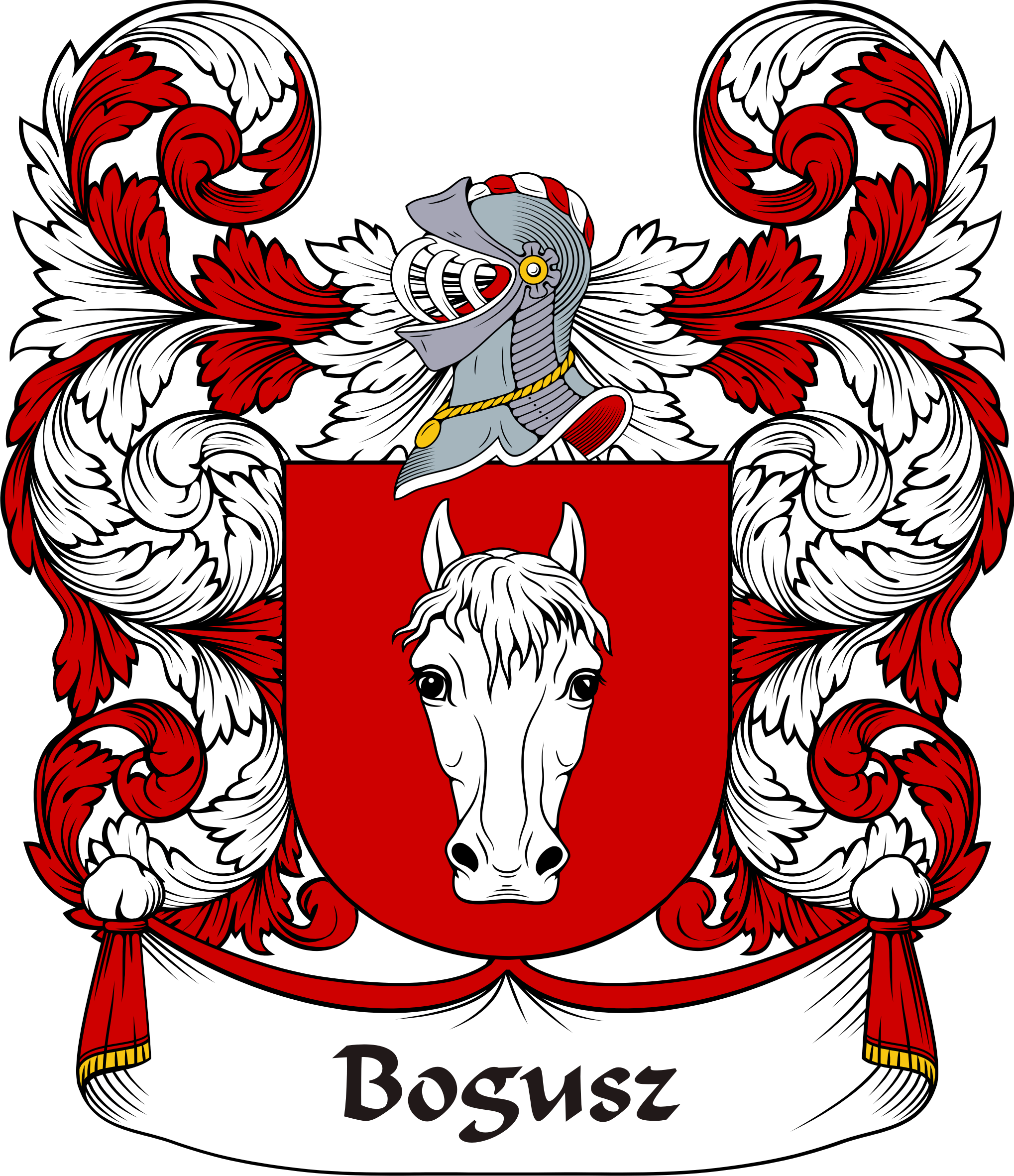
Herb Bogusz

Herb Bojcza

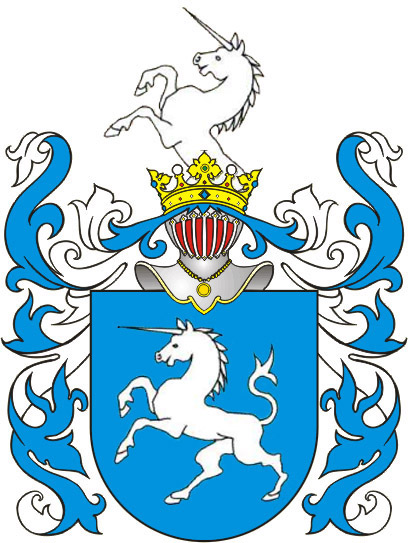
Herb Boncza

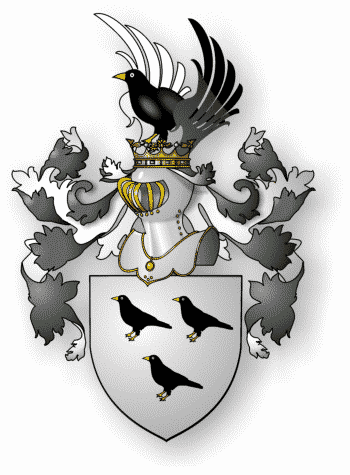
Herb Borch (Trzy-Kawki, Trzy-Kruki)

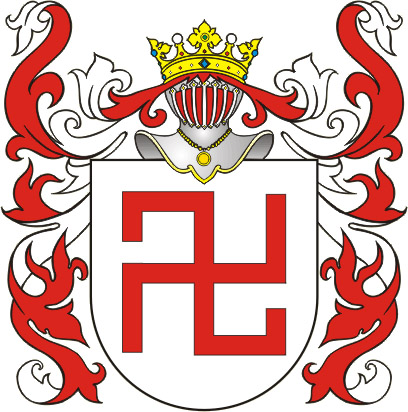
Herb Boreyko

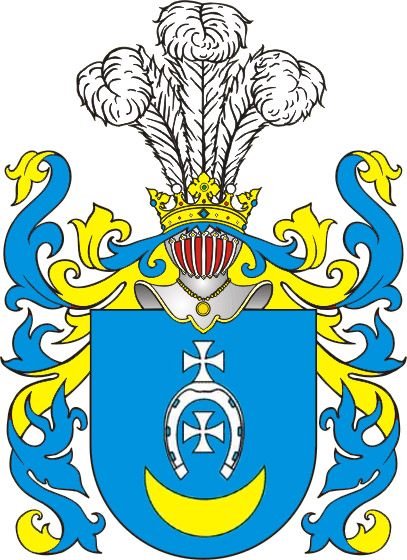
Herb Bożawola

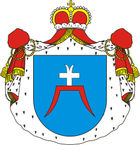
Herb Brama

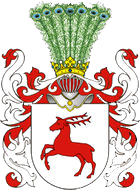
Herb Brochwicz

Herb Brodzic

Herb Bronic

Herb Brzuska

Herb Chalecki

Herb Charyton

Herb Chłędowski

Herb Chodkiewicz

Herb Cholewa

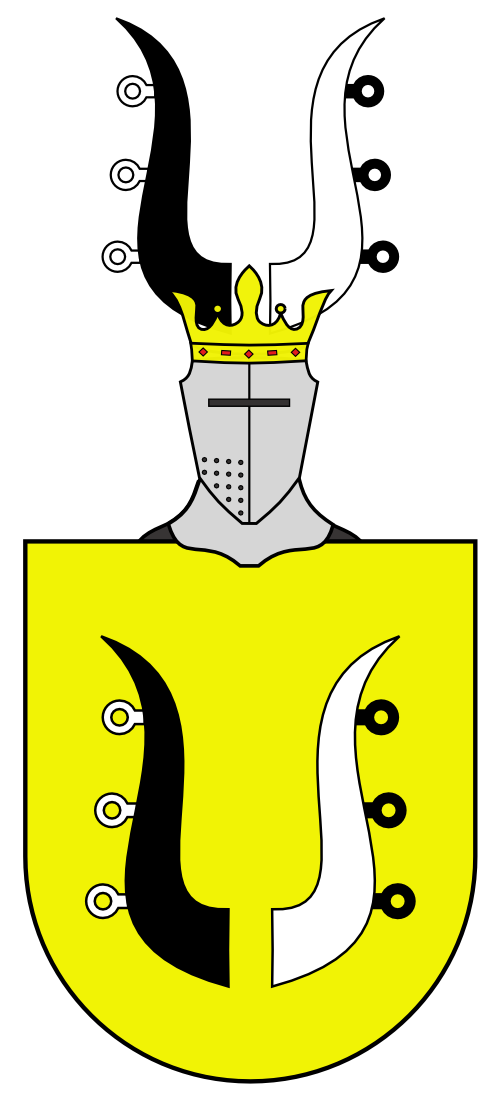
Herb Choryński

Herb Cielątkowa

Herb Cieleski

Herb Ciężosił

Herb Ciołek

Herb Czartoryski (Pogoń Litewska odmiana)

Herb Czewoja

Herb Dąb

Herb Dąbrowa

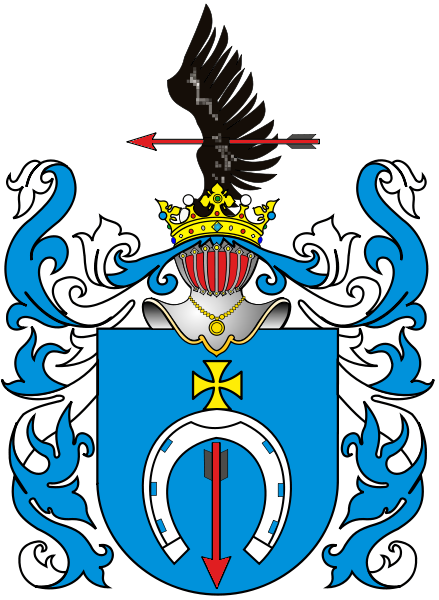
Herb Dąbrowski (Dołęga odmiana)

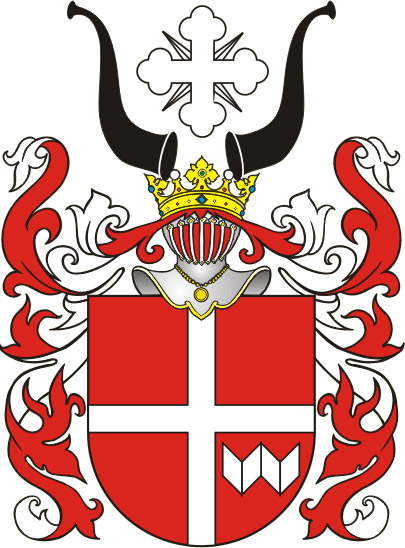
Herb Dębno

Herb Dęboróg

Herb Deszpot

Herb Dołęga

Herb Doliwa

Herb Drogosław

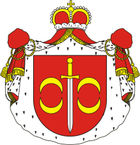
Herb Druck

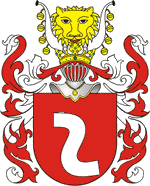
Herb Drużyna

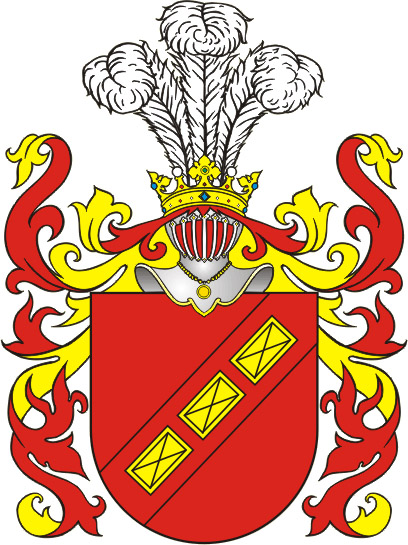
Herb Drya

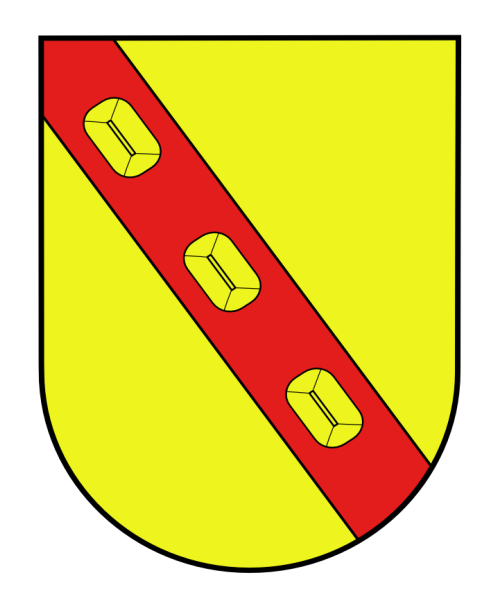
Herb Drya IV

Herb Drzewica

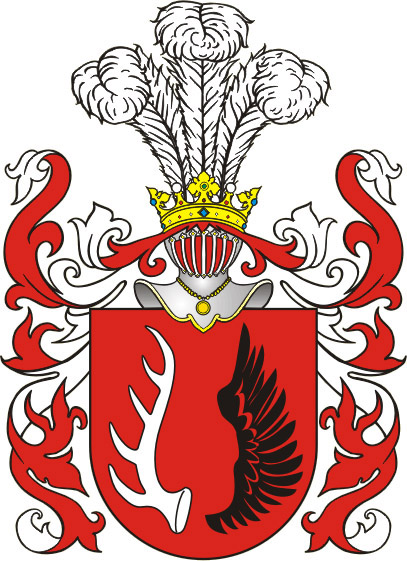
Herb Działosza

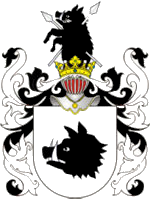
Herb Dzik

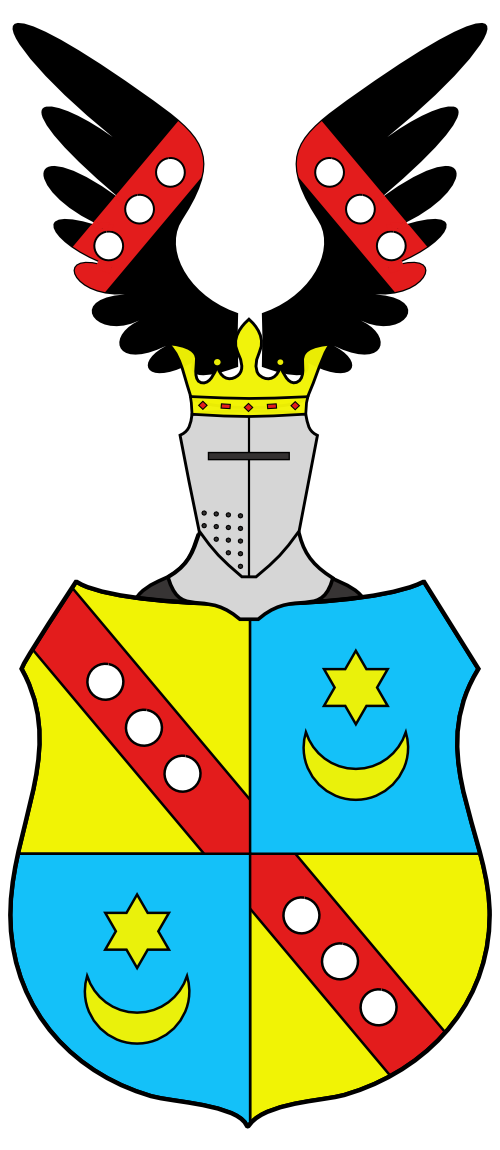
Herb Erbs

Herb Essen

Herb Estken

Herb Felseis

Herb Finke

Herb Fleming

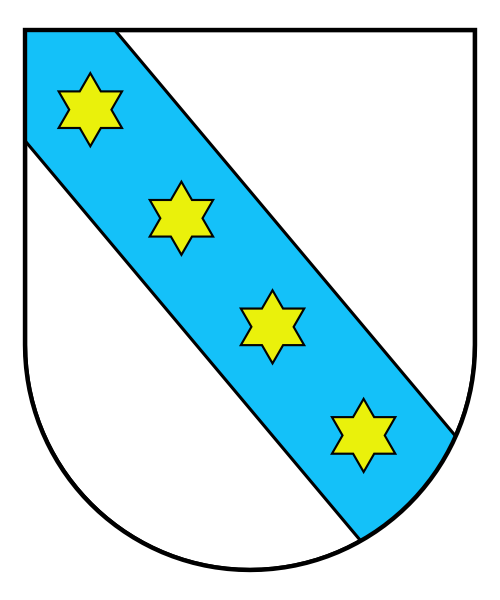
Herb Fogelfeder

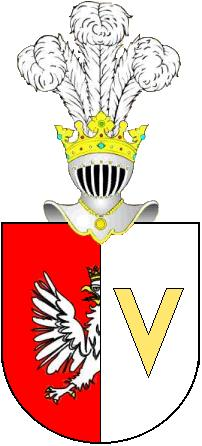
Herb Fornalski

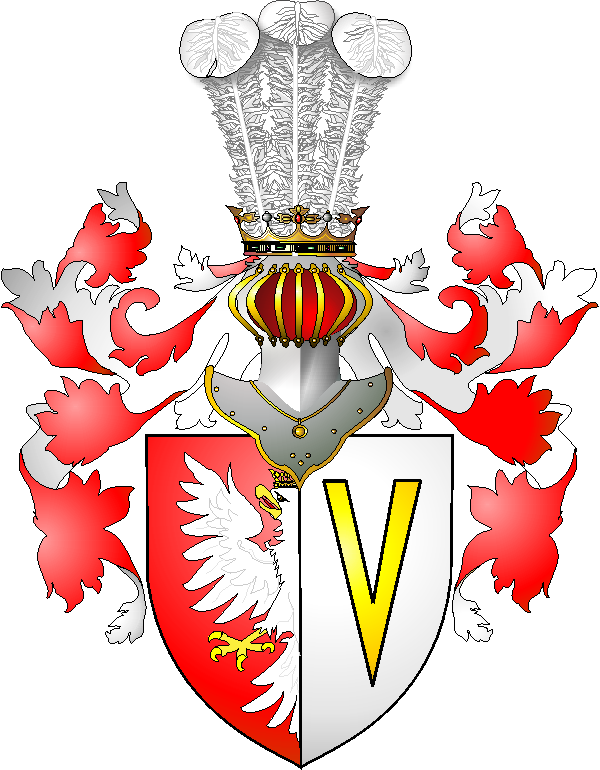
Herb Fornalski (Orlica odm.)

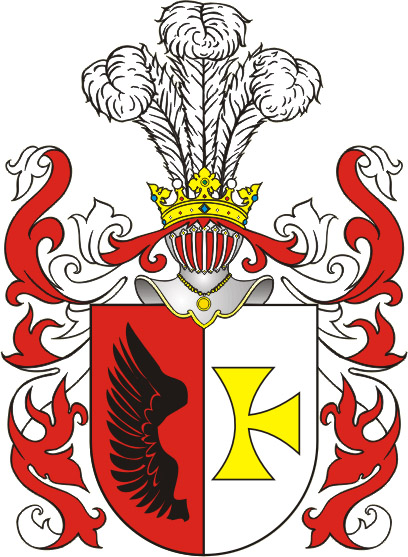
Herb Giejszt

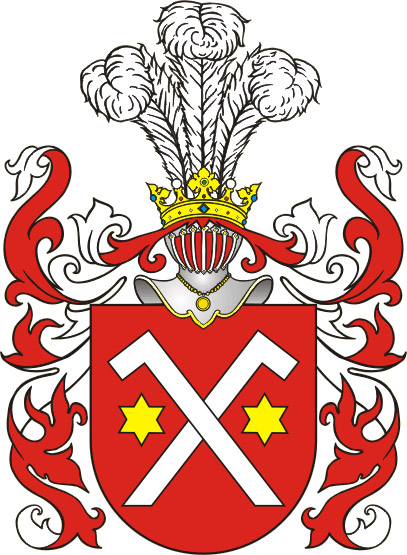
Herb Giejsztor

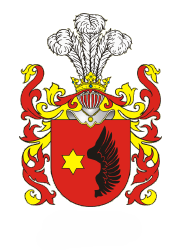
Herb Giełgud

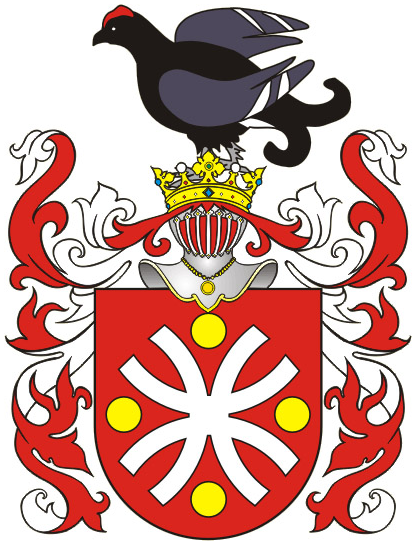
Herb Gierałt

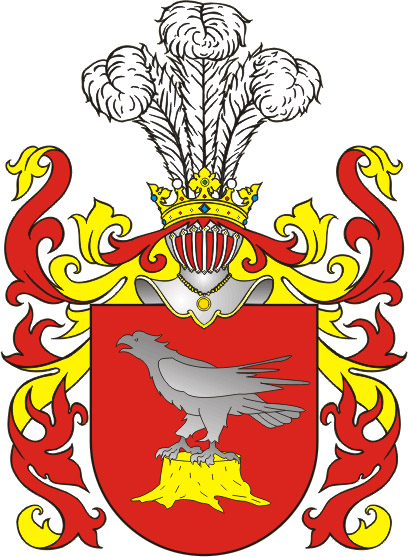
Herb Ginwiłł

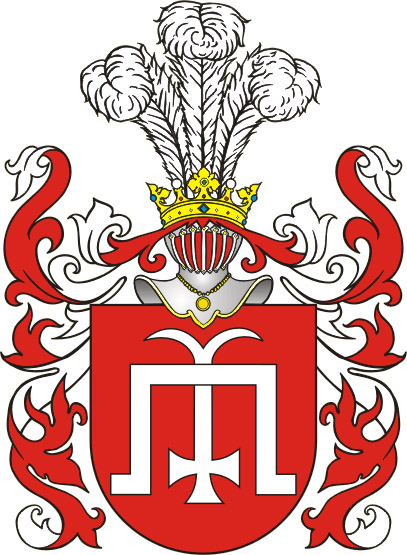
Herb Glinski

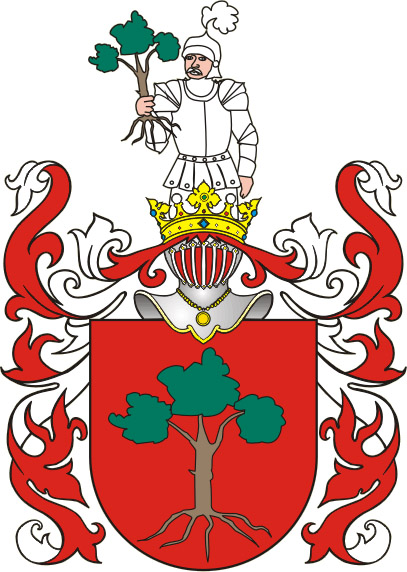
Herb Godziemba

Herb Gozdawa (Dzierżoń, Dervan)

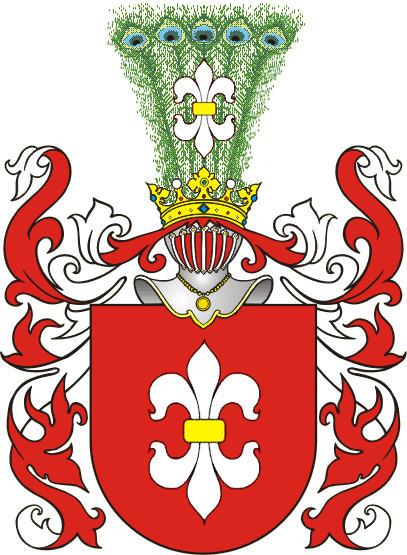
Herb Gozdawa

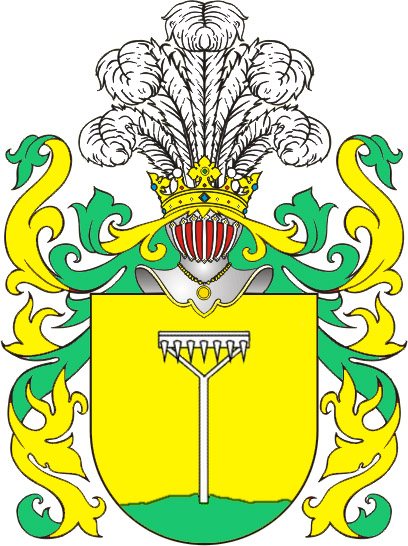
Herb Grabie

Herb Groty

Herb Gryf (Świeboda)

Herb Gryf II (Pomerania)

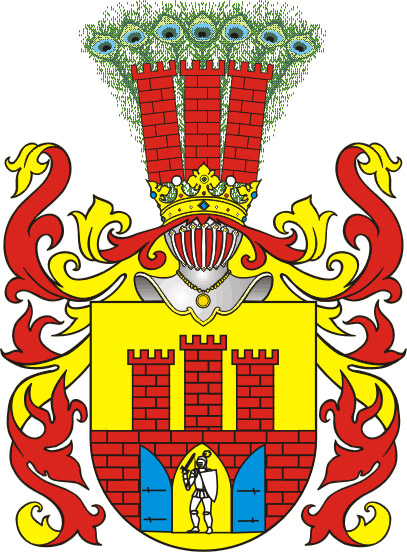
Herb Grzymała

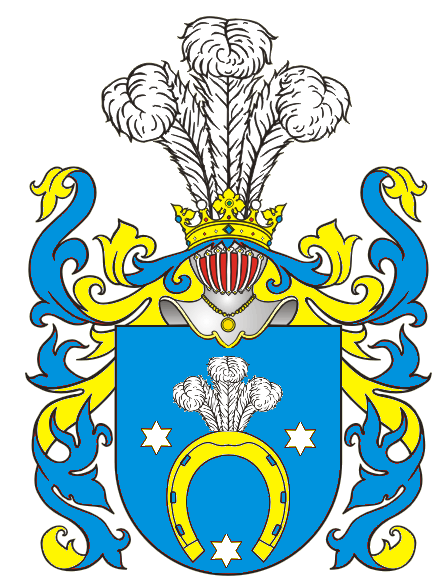
Herb Gutak

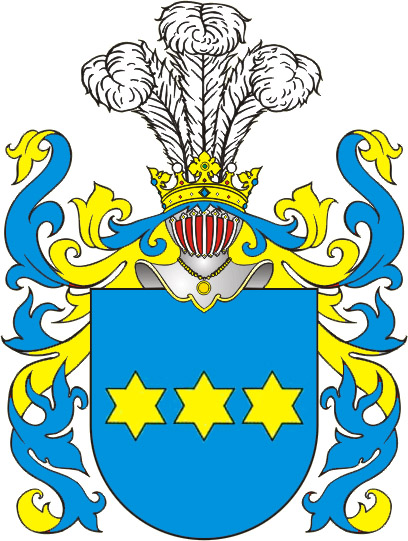
Herb Gwiazdy

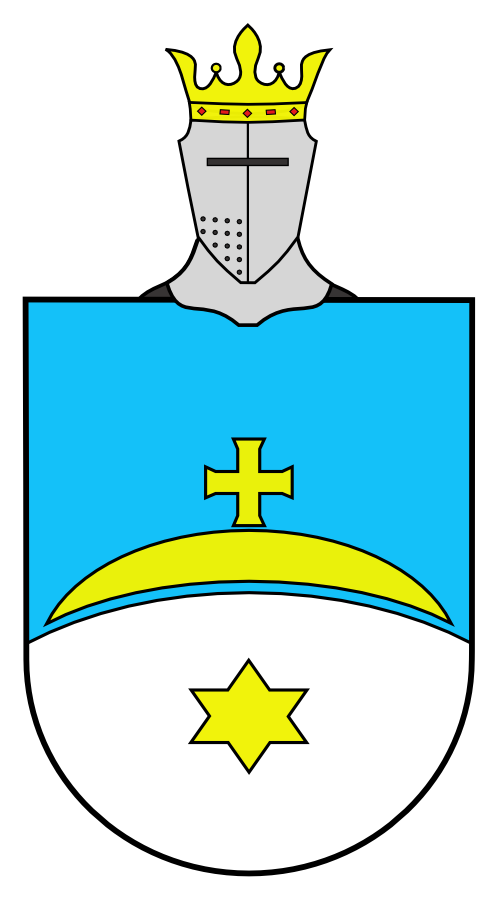
Herb Gwiaździcz

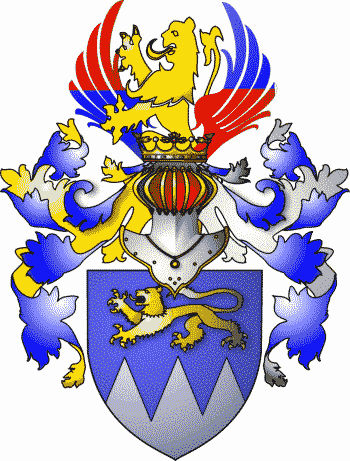
Herb Hejking

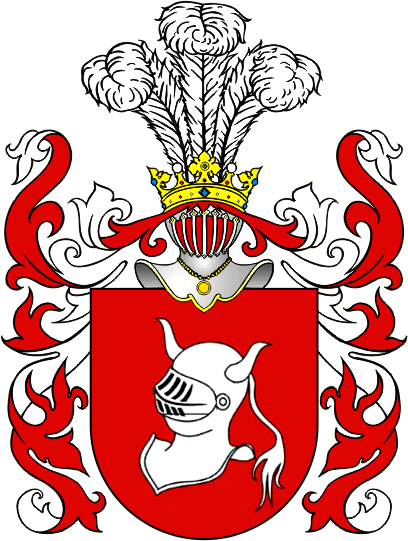
Herb Hełm

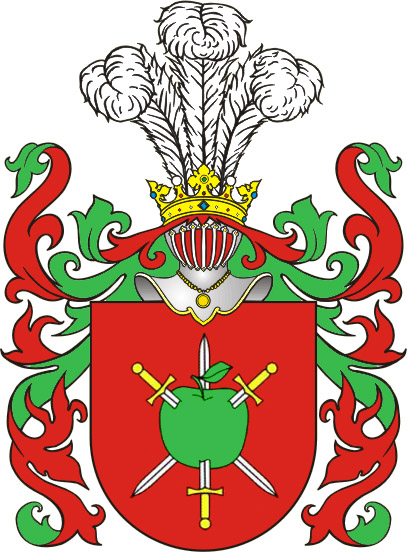
Herb Herburt

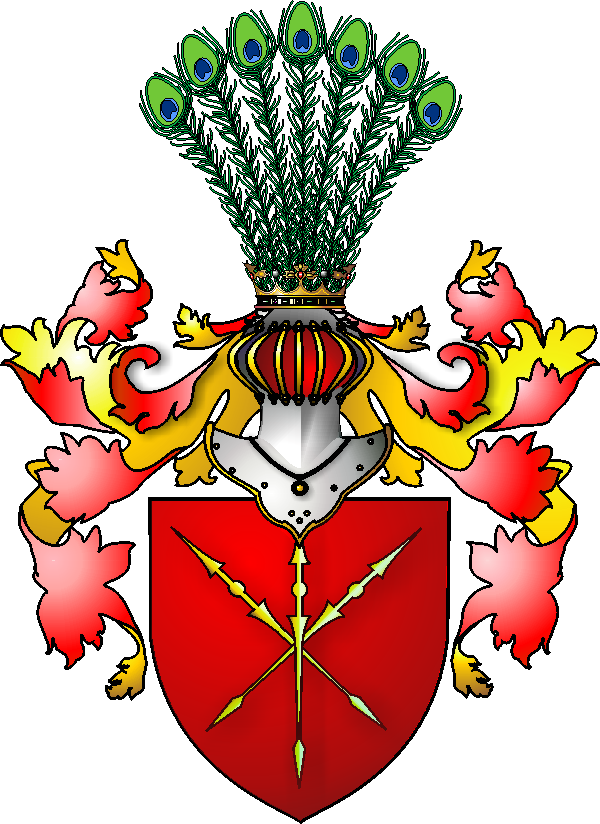
Herb Hilchen

Herb Hilzen

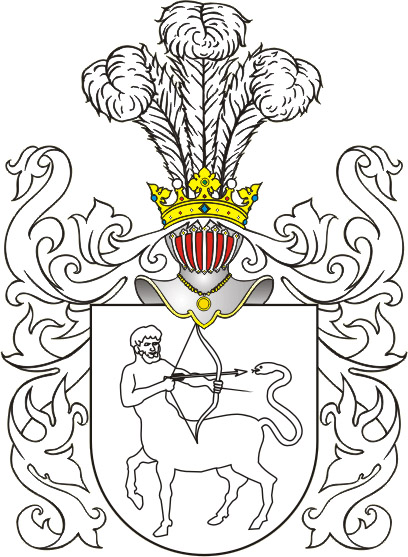
Herb Hipocentaur

Herb Hodyc

Herb Hołownia

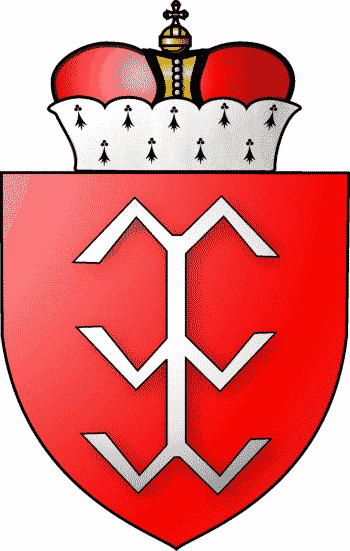
Herb Hołownia II

Herb Hornowski

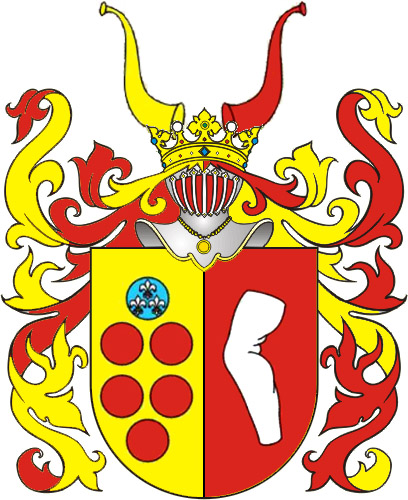
Herb Hozyusz

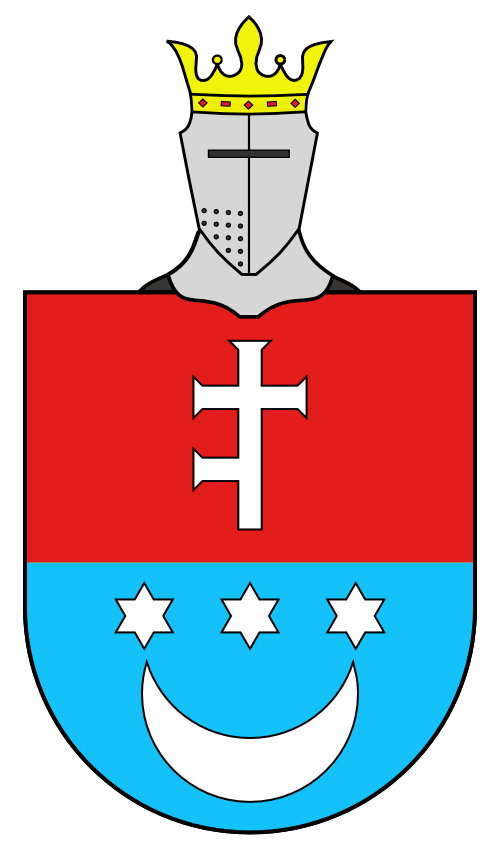
Herb Husarzewski

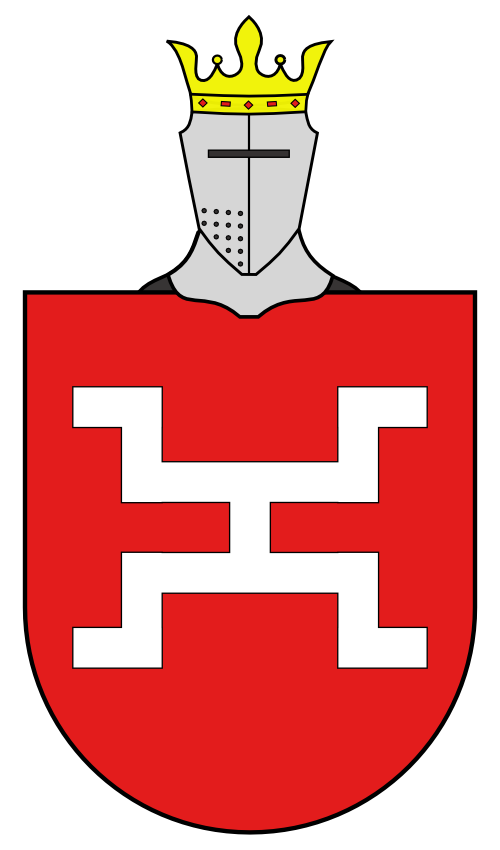
Herb Hutor

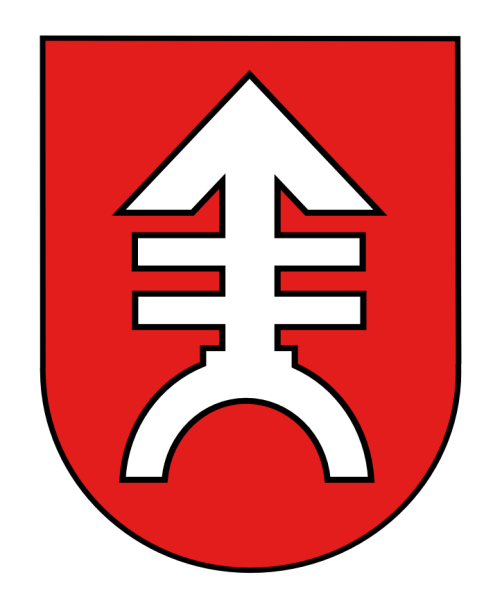
Herb Jakimowicz

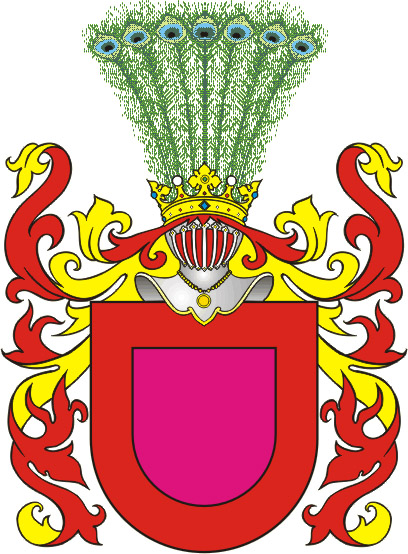
Herb Janina

Herb Jasieńczyk

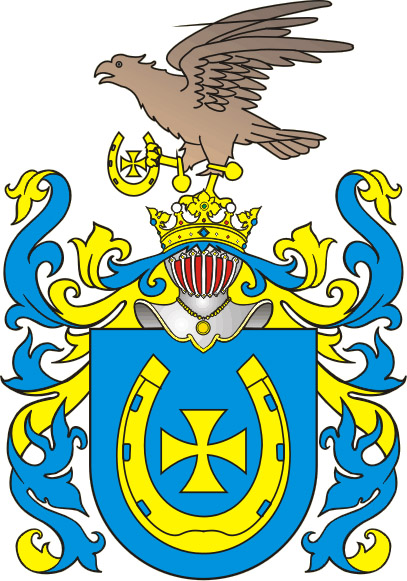
Herb Jastrzębiec

Herb Jelita (Koźlarogi, Koźlerogi, Nagody)

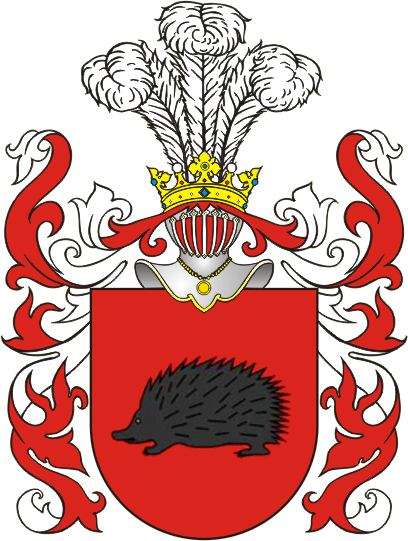
Herb Jeż

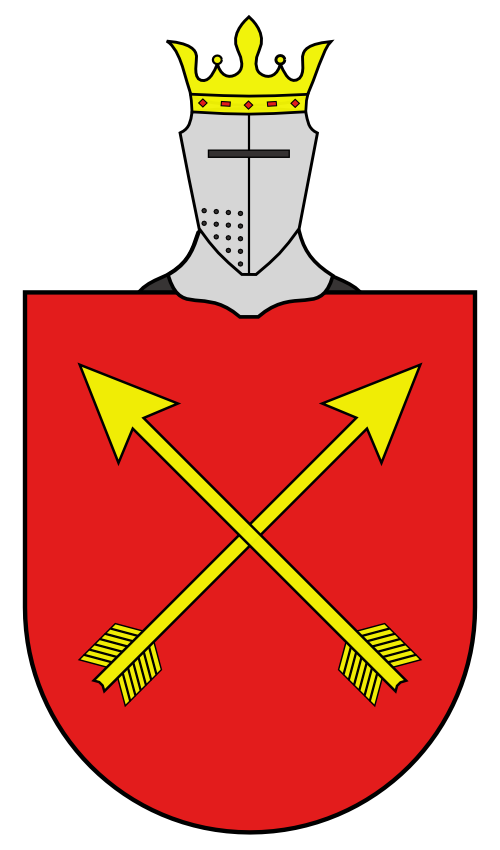
Herb Jodzieszko

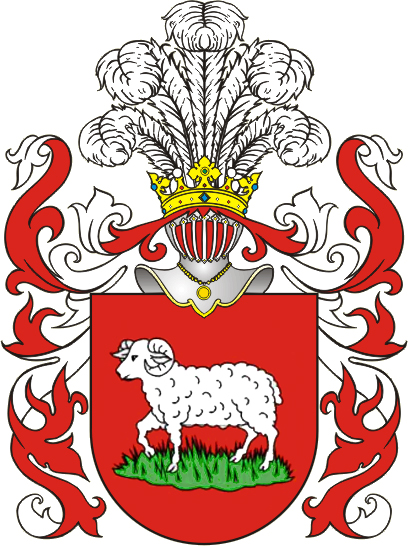
Herb Junosza

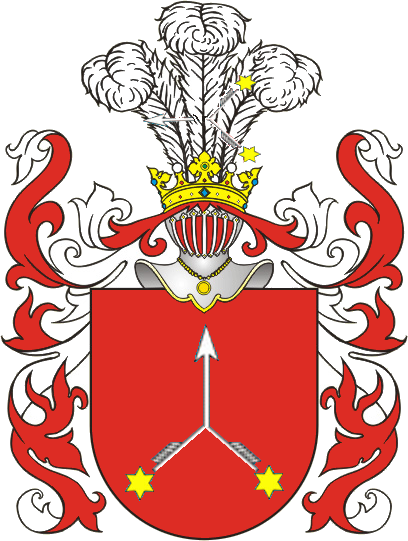
Herb Kalinowa

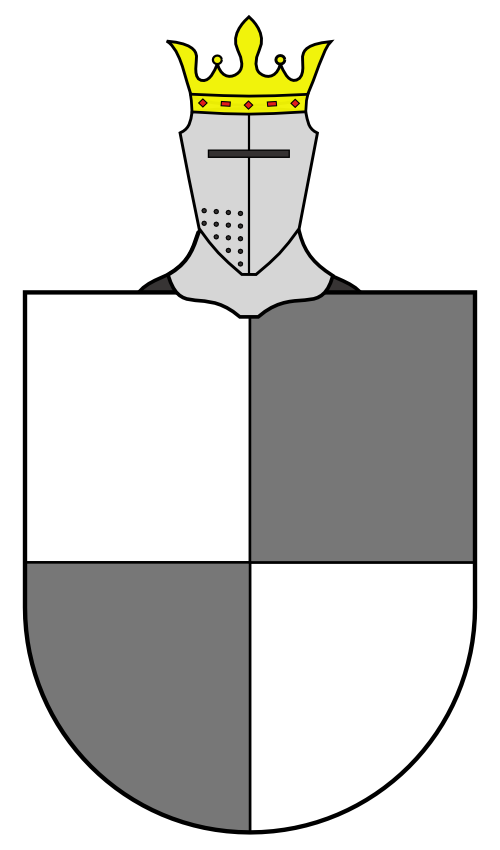
Herb Karęga

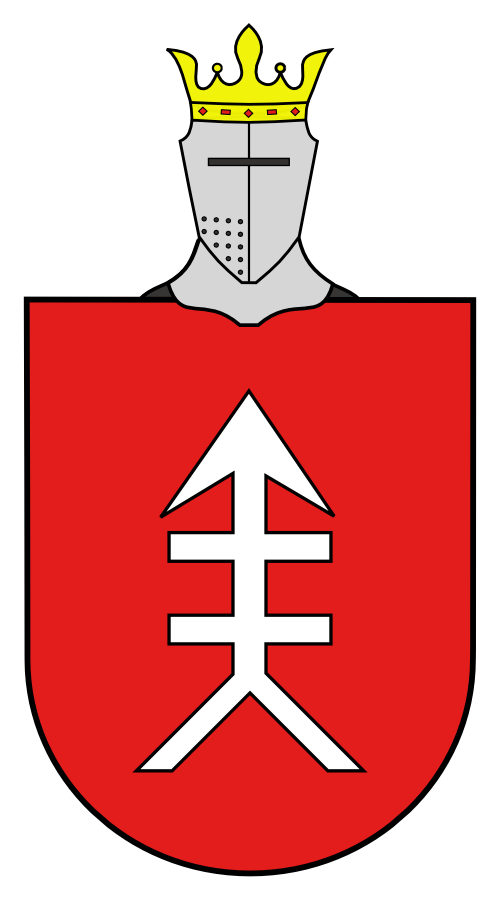
Herb Karnicki I

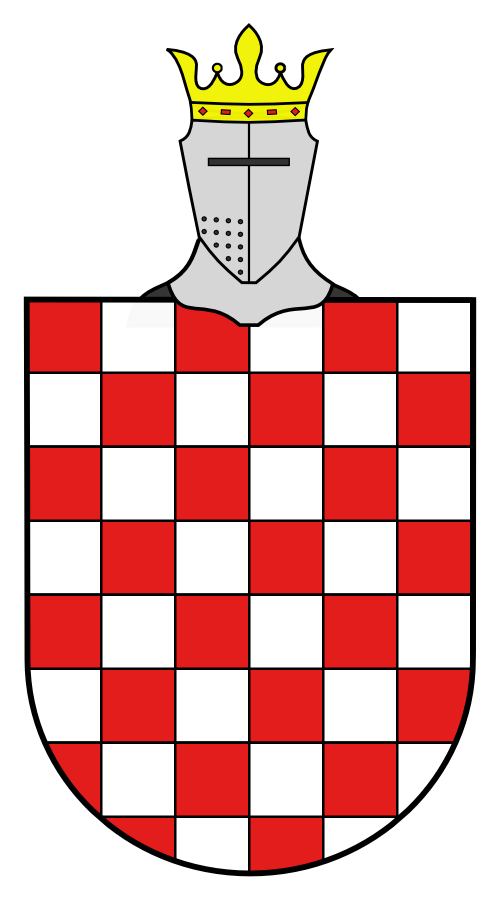
Herb Karnicki II

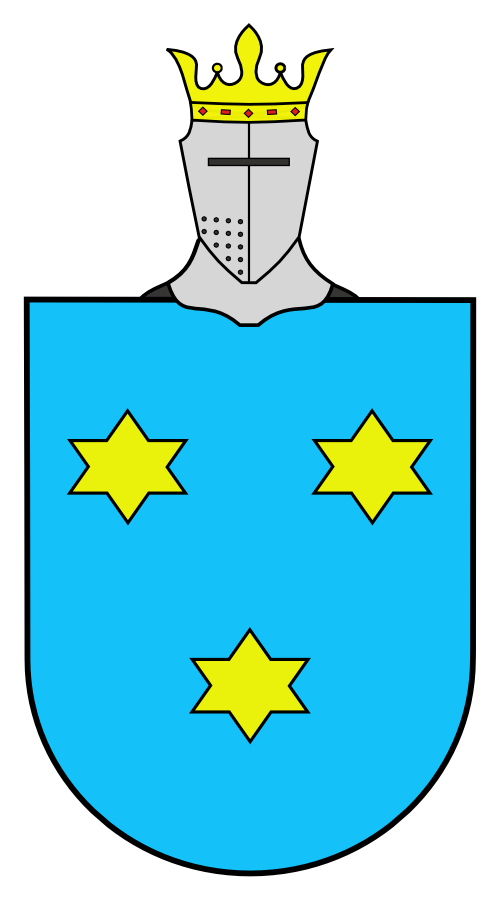
Herb Karp

Herb Kierdeja

Herb Klamry

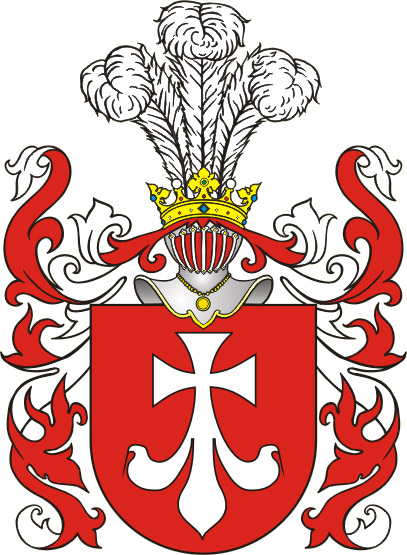
Herb Komar

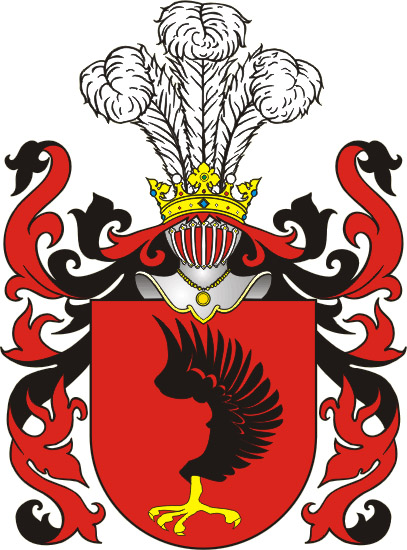
Herb Kopacz

Herb Kopaszyna

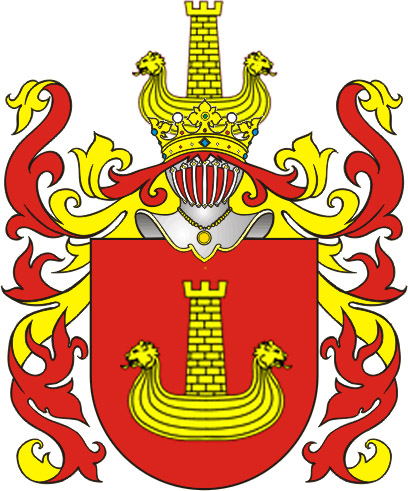
Herb Korab

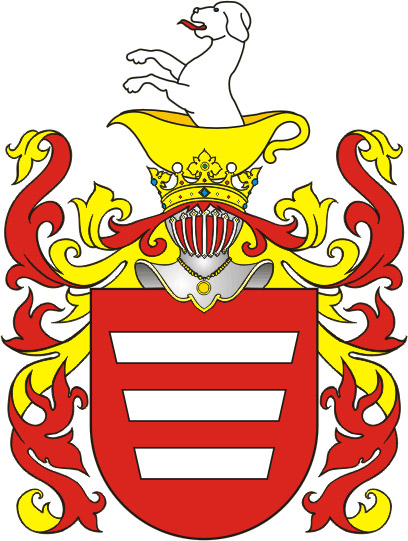
Herb Korczak

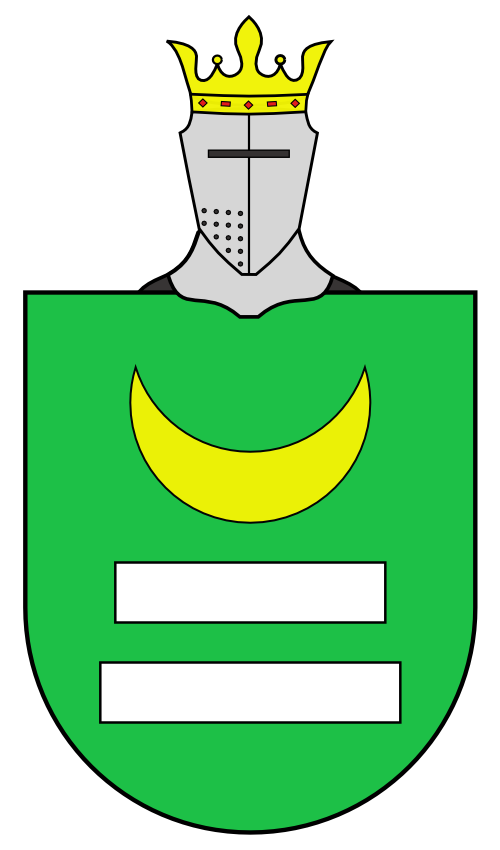
Herb Korczyk

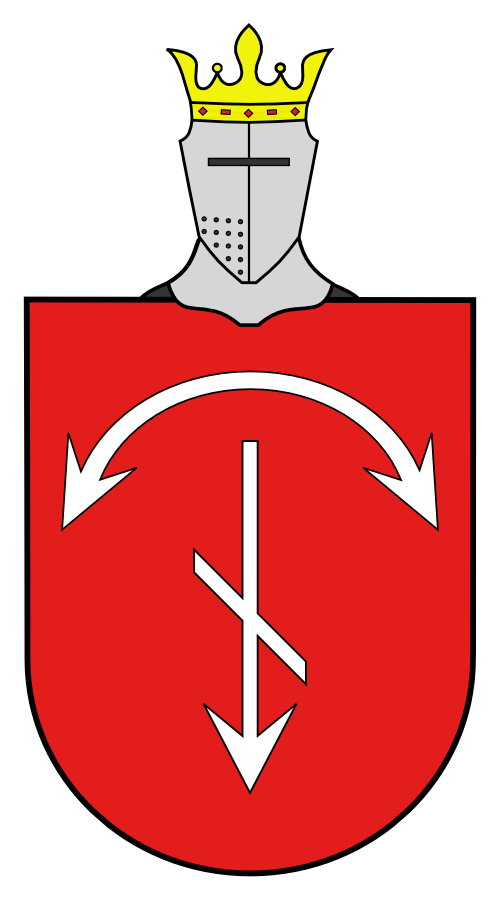
Herb Kordysz

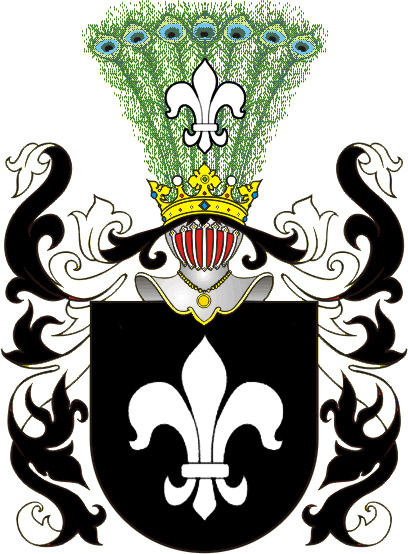
Herb Korsak

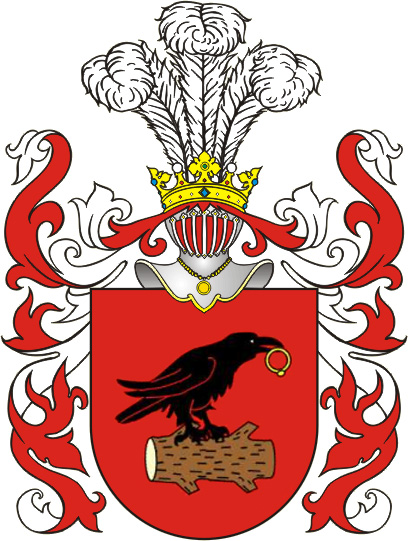
Herb Korwin (Ślepowron odmiana)

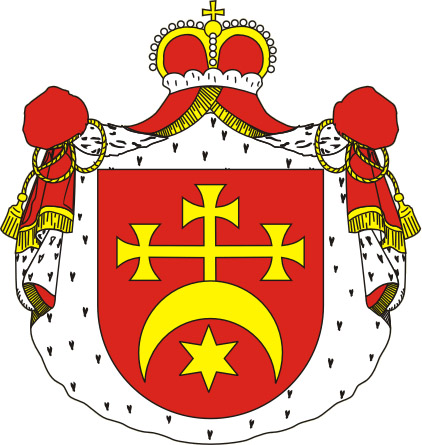
Herb Korybut

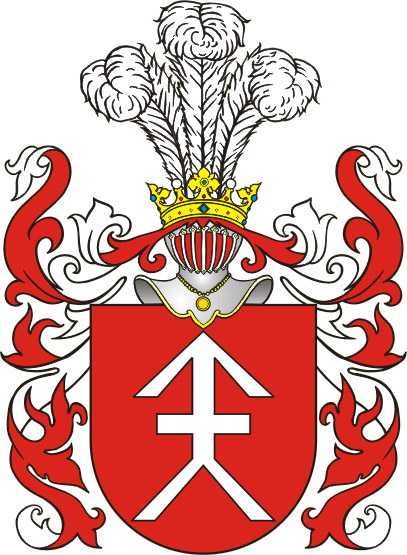
Herb Kościesza

Herb Kostrowiec I

Herb Kostrowiec II

Herb Kot-Morski

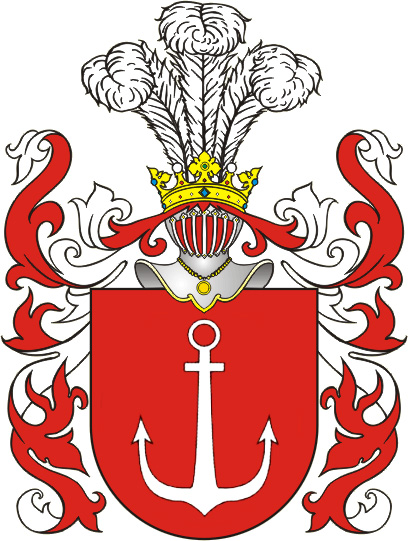
Herb Kotwica

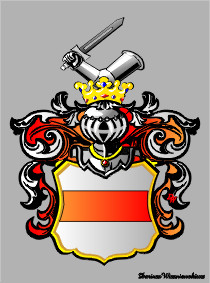
Herb Kotwicz

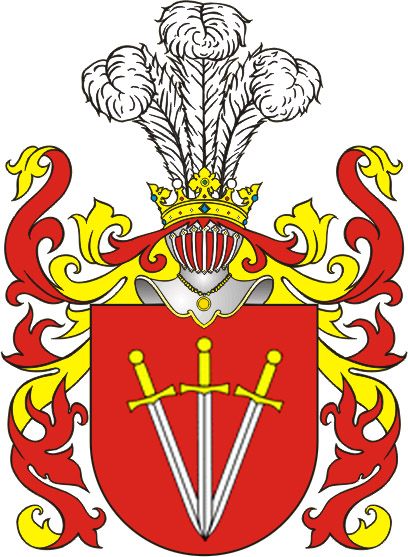
Herb Kownia

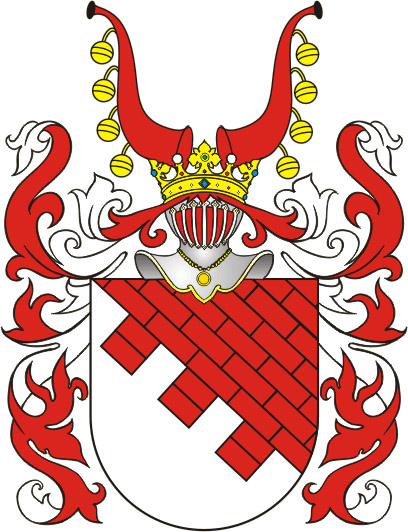
Herb Kozłowski

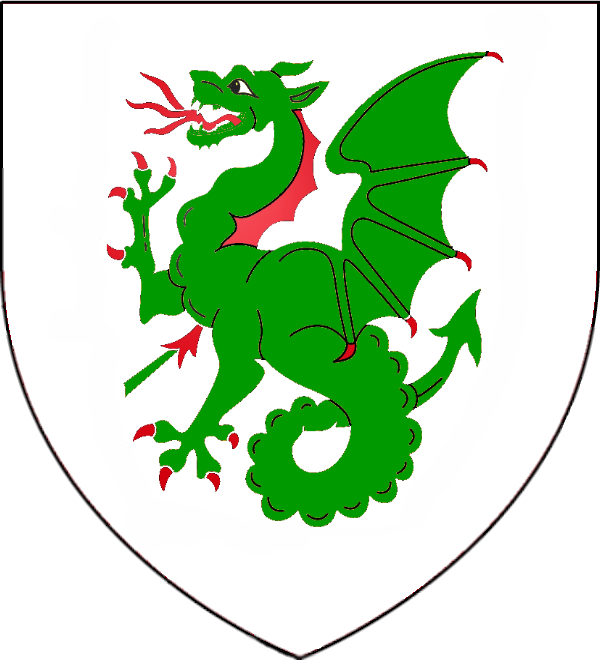
Herb Krak (Druk, Kač)

Herb Krak II (Druk, Kač)

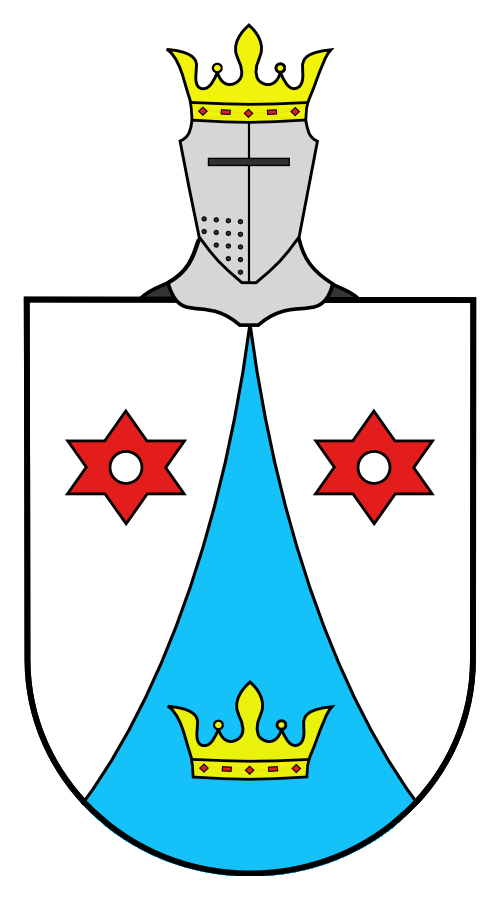
Herb Kronwald

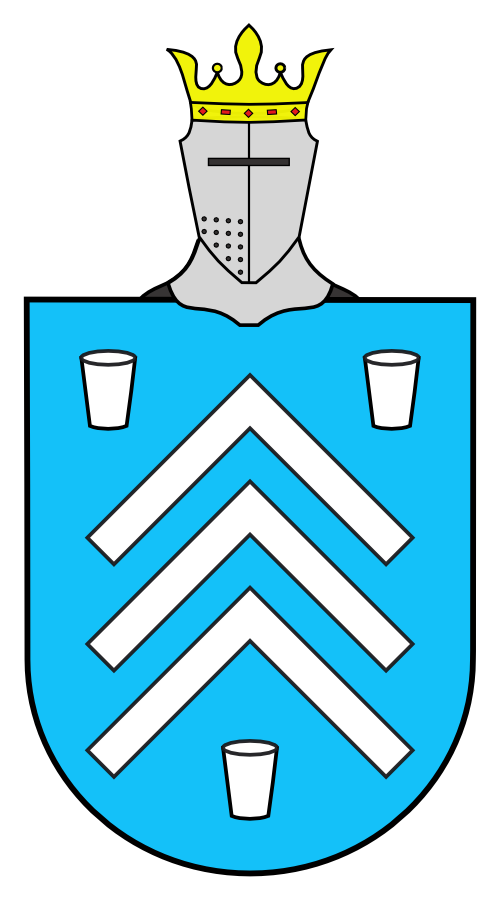
Herb Kruzer

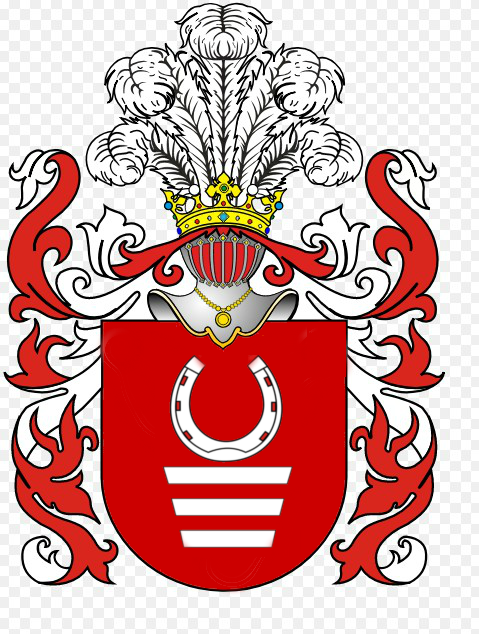
Herb Krynicki

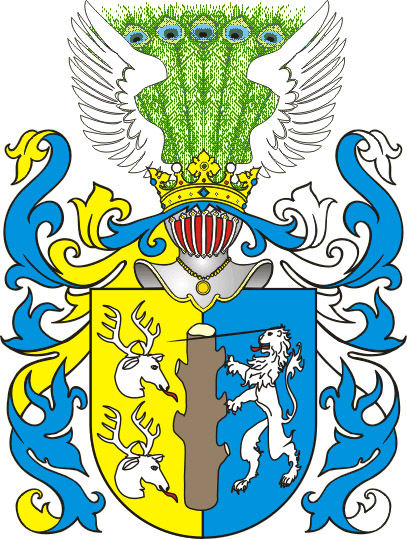
Herb Kryszpin

Herb Krzywda

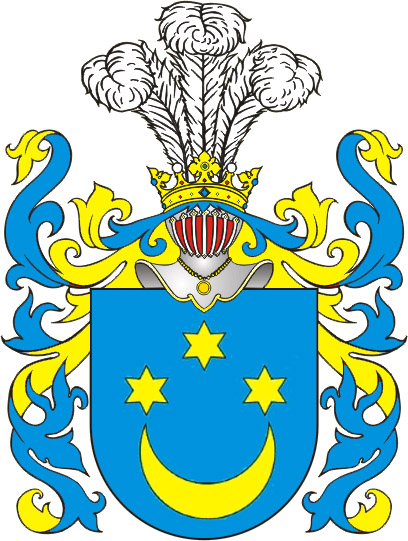
Herb Księżyc

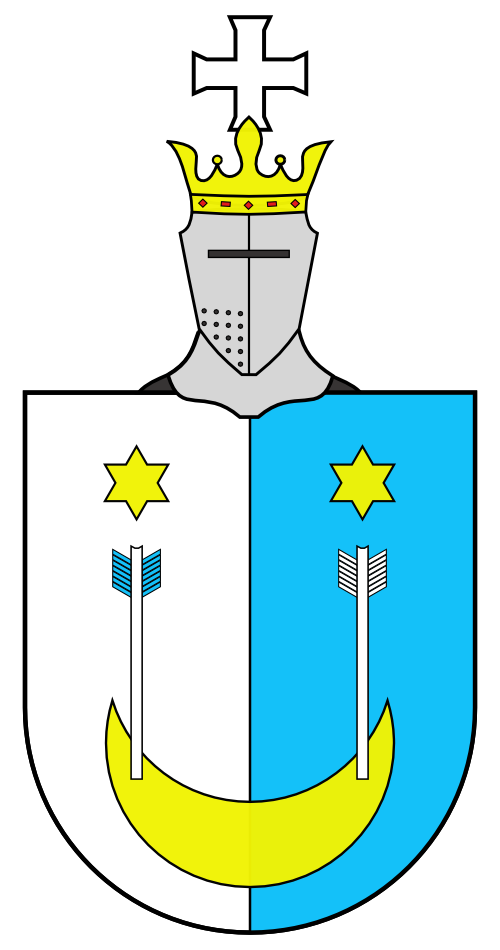
Herb Kujk

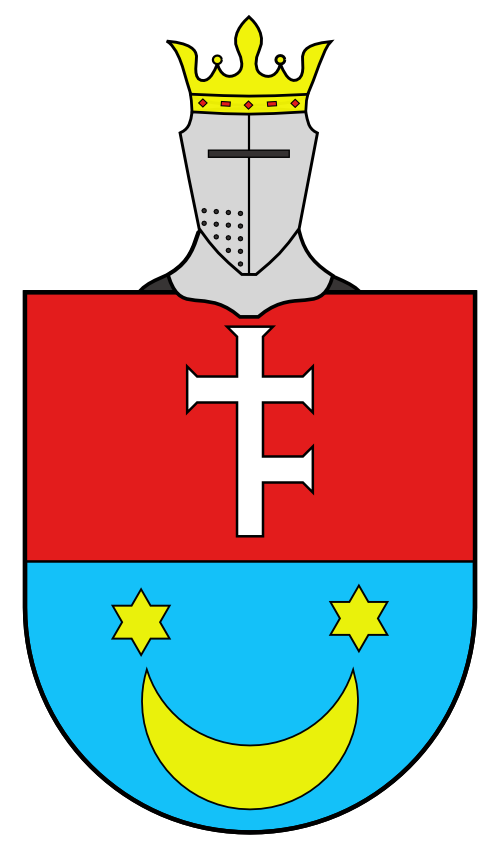
Herb Kulikowski

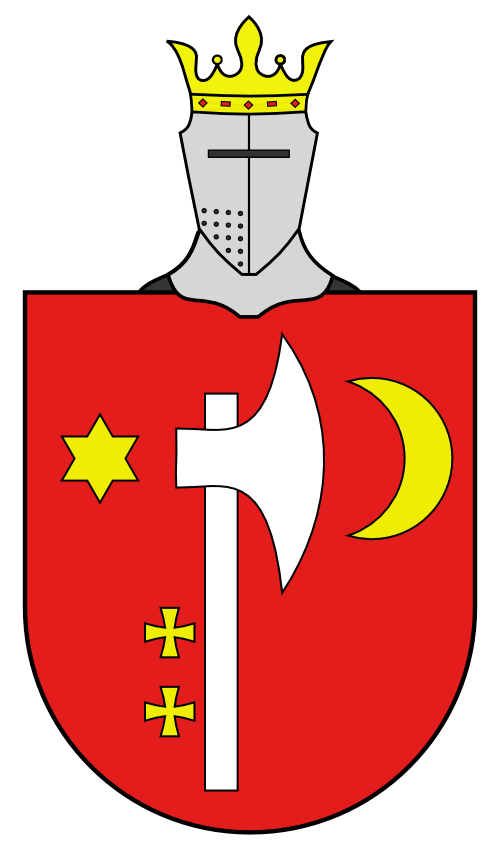
Herb Kułak

Herb Kur

Herb Kur II

Herb Kusza

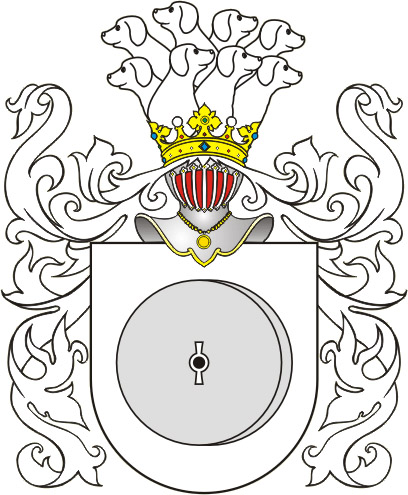
Herb Kuszaba

Herb Łabędź (Dunin)

Herb Lachnicki

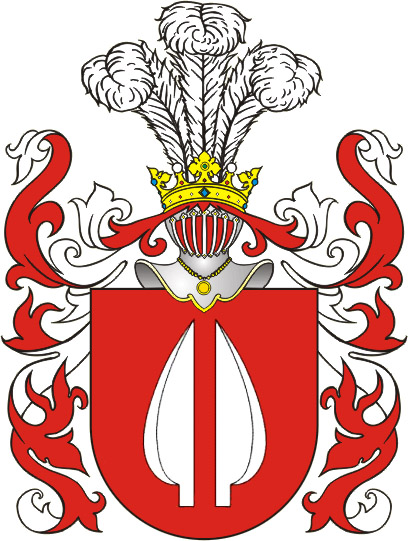
Herb Larysza

Herb Leliwa

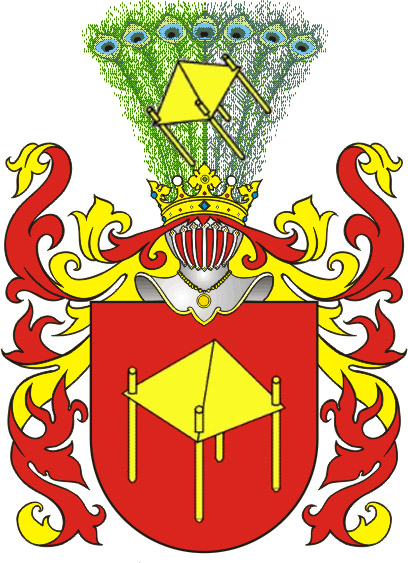
Herb Leszczyc

Herb Lis

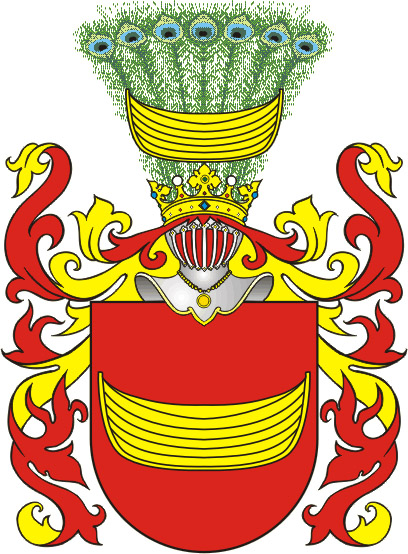
Herb Łodzia

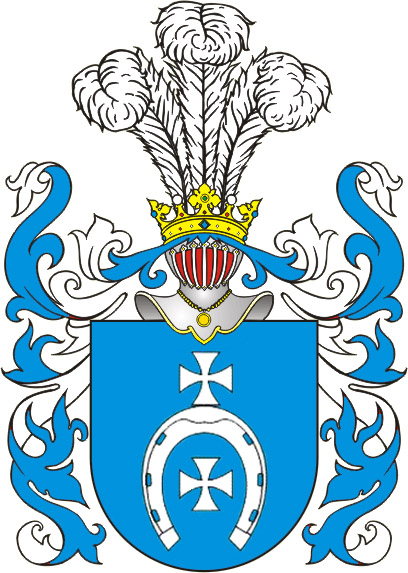
Herb Lubicz

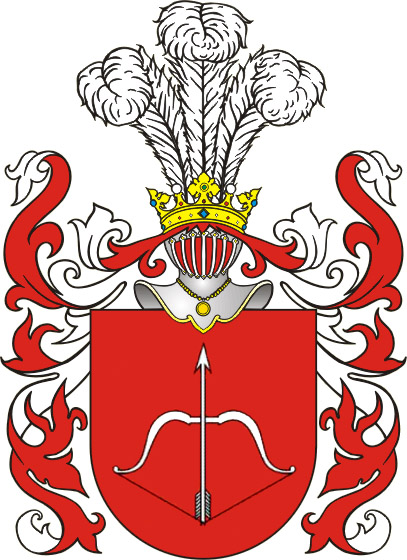
Herb Łuk

Herb Mądrostki

Herb Masalski ks. III

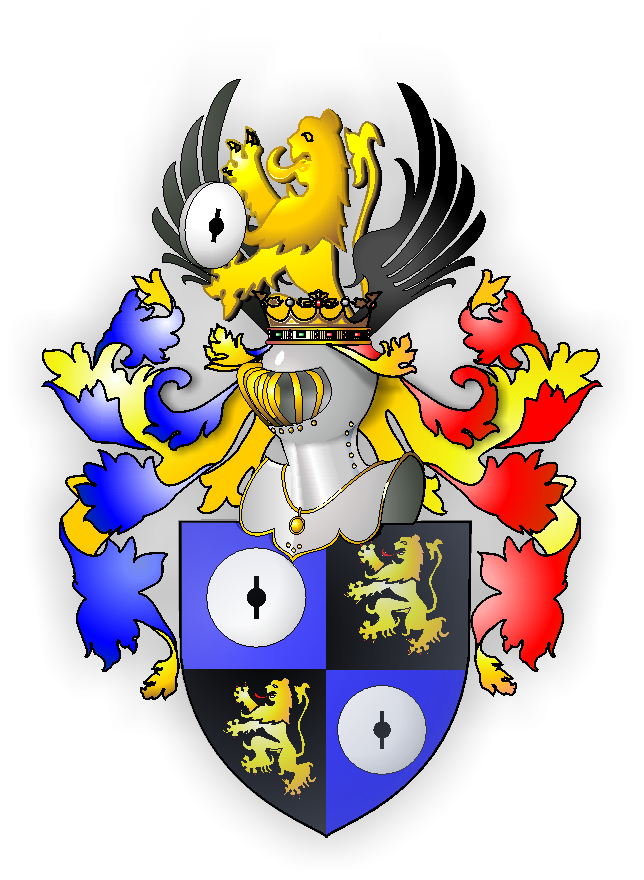
Herb Miller

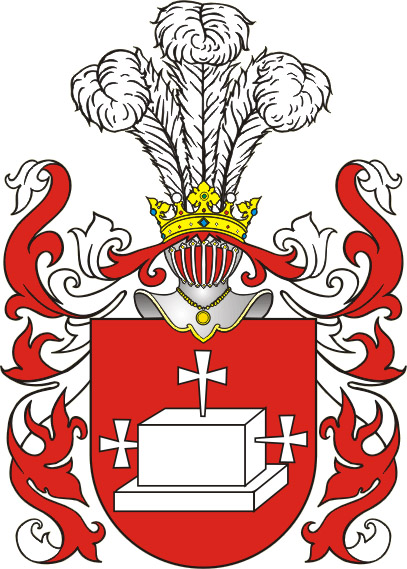
Herb Mogiła

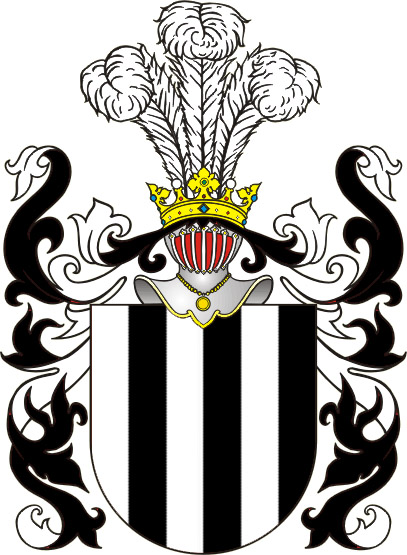
Herb Nabram

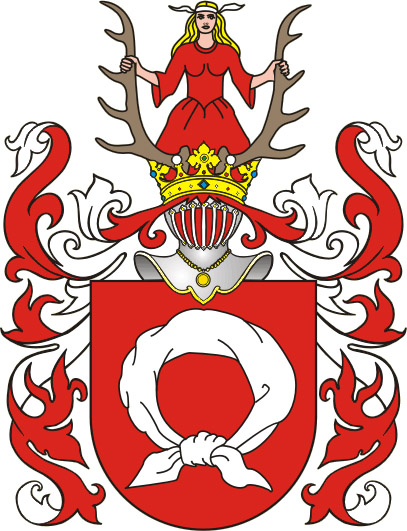
Herb Nałęcz

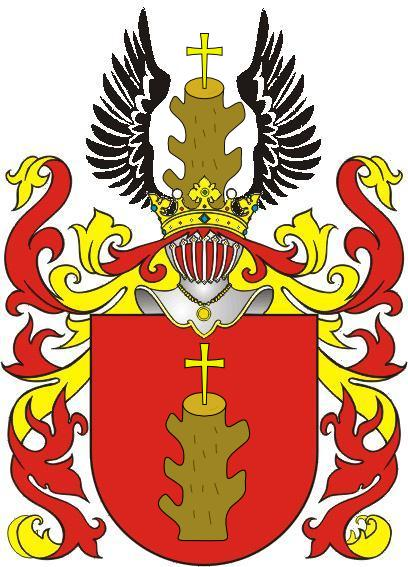
Herb Nieczuja

Herb Niesobia

Herb Niszcz

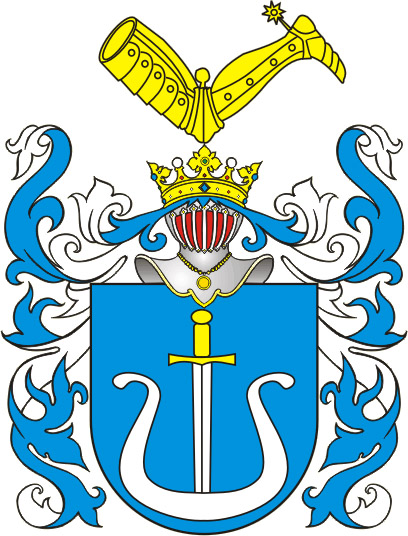
Herb Nowina

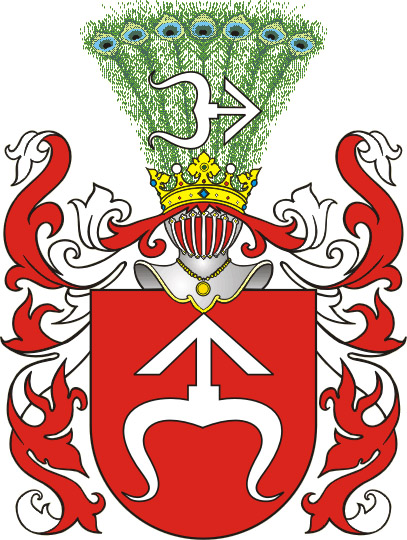
Herb Odrowąż

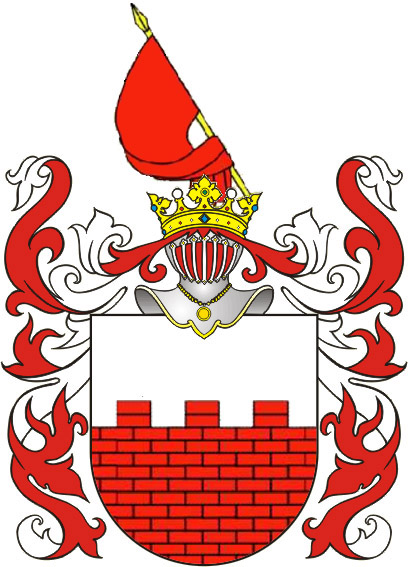
Herb Odwaga

Herb Odyniec

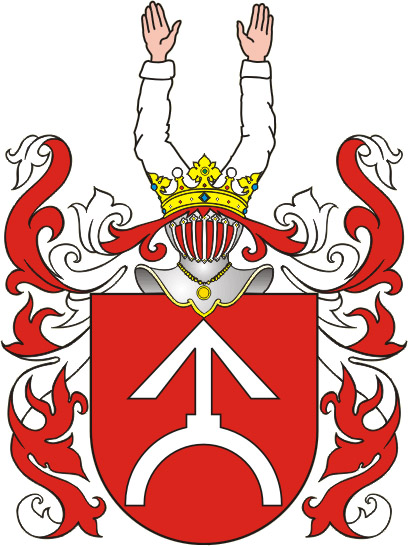
Herb Ogończyk

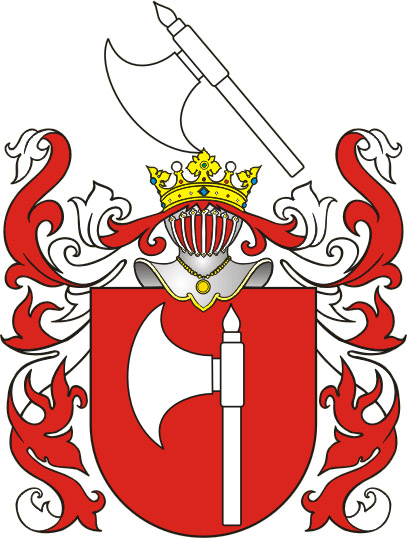
Herb Oksza

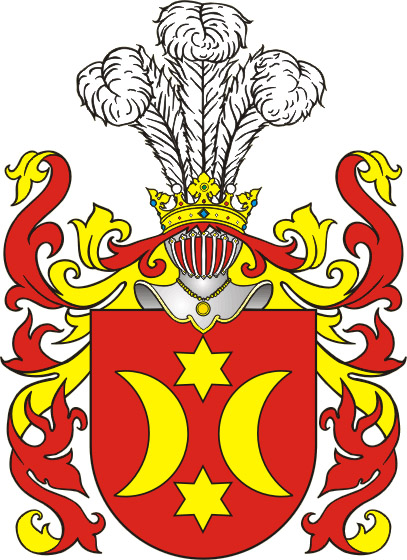
Herb Orda

Herb Orla

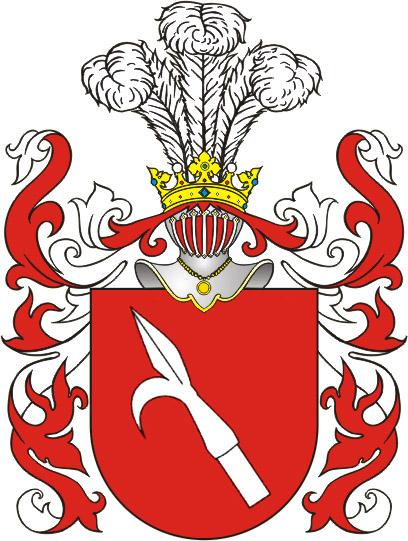
Herb Osek

Herb Ossoliński (Topór)

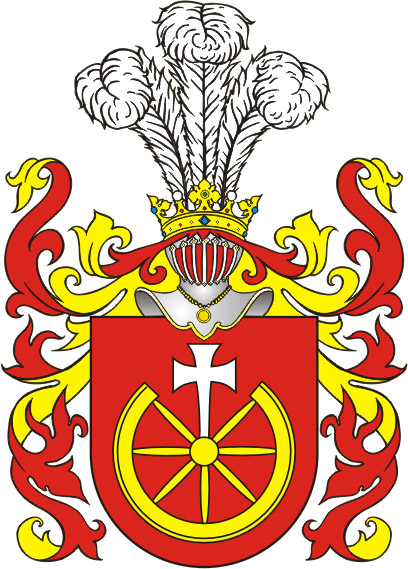
Herb Ossorya

Herb Ostoja (medieval)

Herb Ostoja

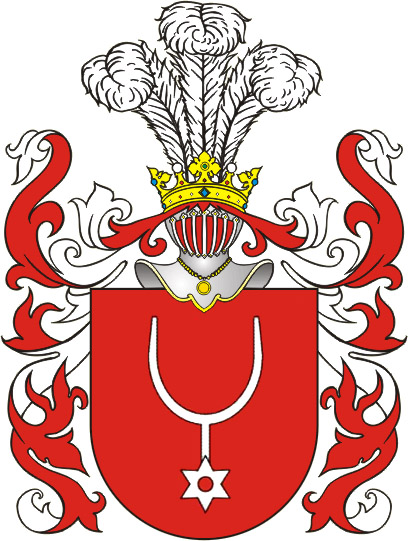
Herb Ostroga

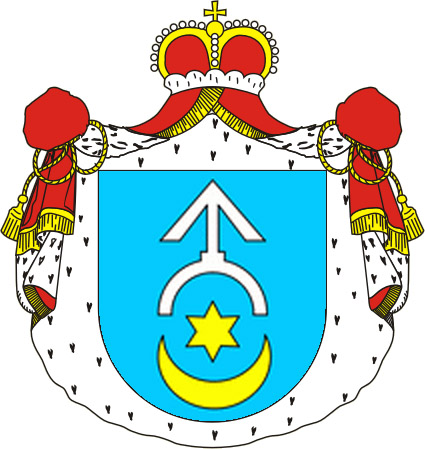
Herb Ostrogski

Herb Pernus (Sperun, Spyra)

Herb Piast (Kołodziej)

Herb Piast

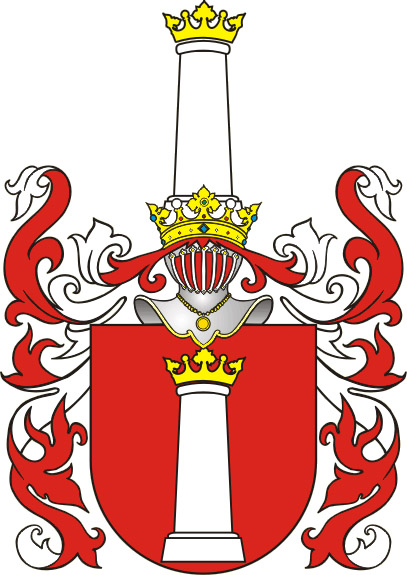
Herb Pierzchała (Sperski)

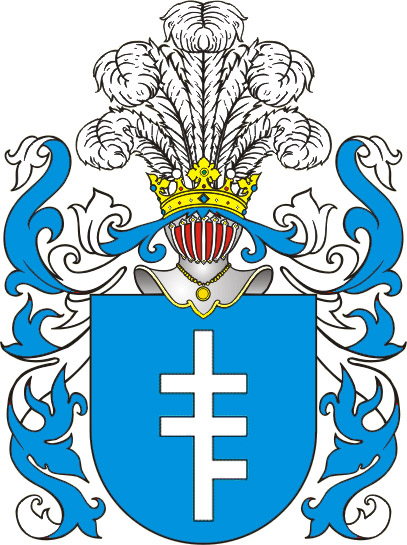
Herb Pilawa

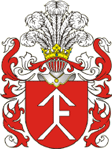
Herb Piłsudski

Herb Pobóg

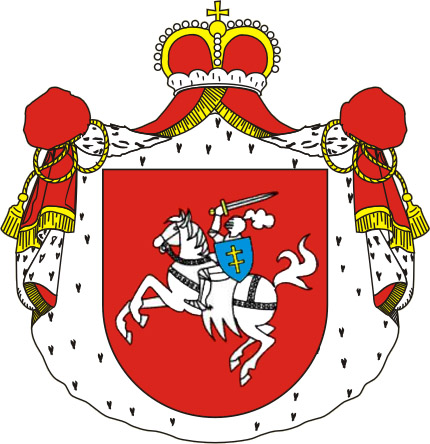
Herb Pogoń Litewska

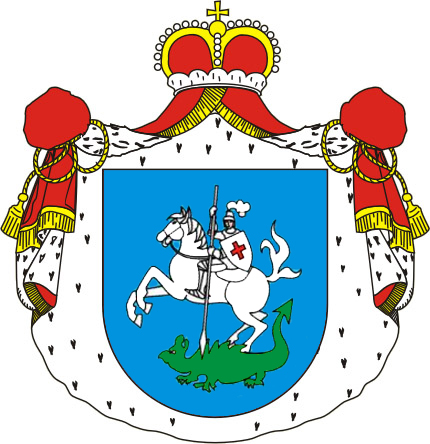
Herb Pogoń Ruska

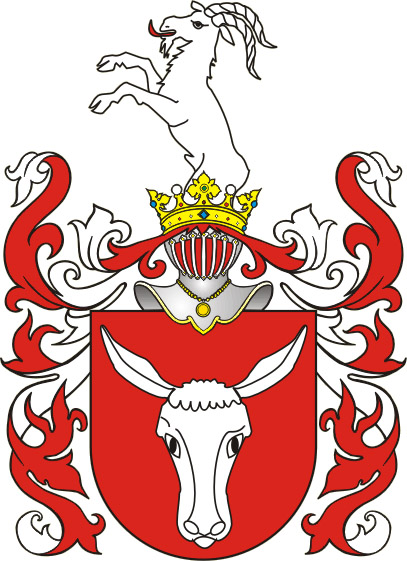
Herb Półkozic

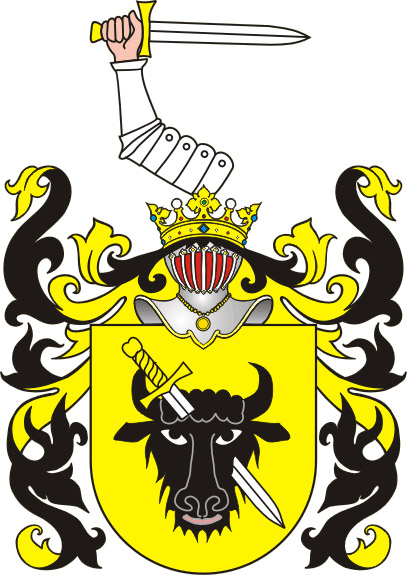
Herb Pomian

Herb Poraj

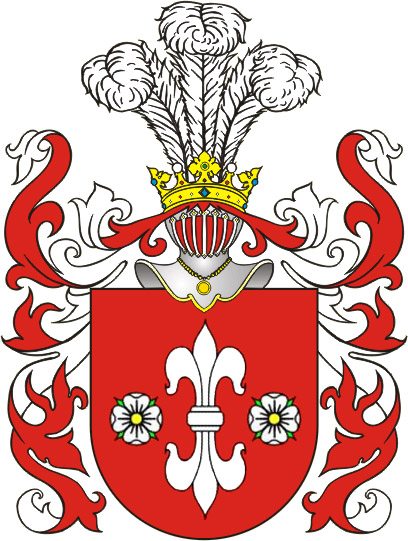
Herb Poronia

Herb Pół Orła

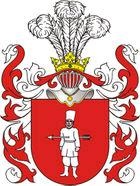
Herb Późniak

Herb Prus I

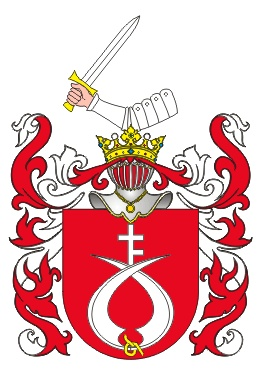
Herb Pus II (Wilczekosy)

Herb Prus III

Herb Przegonia

Herb Przerowa

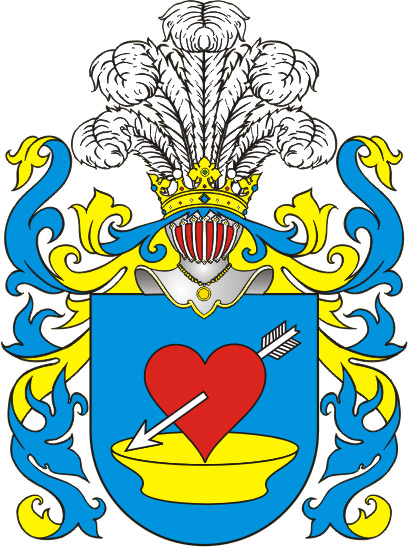
Herb Przyjaciel

Herb Puchała

Herb Radwan

Herb Radzislaw

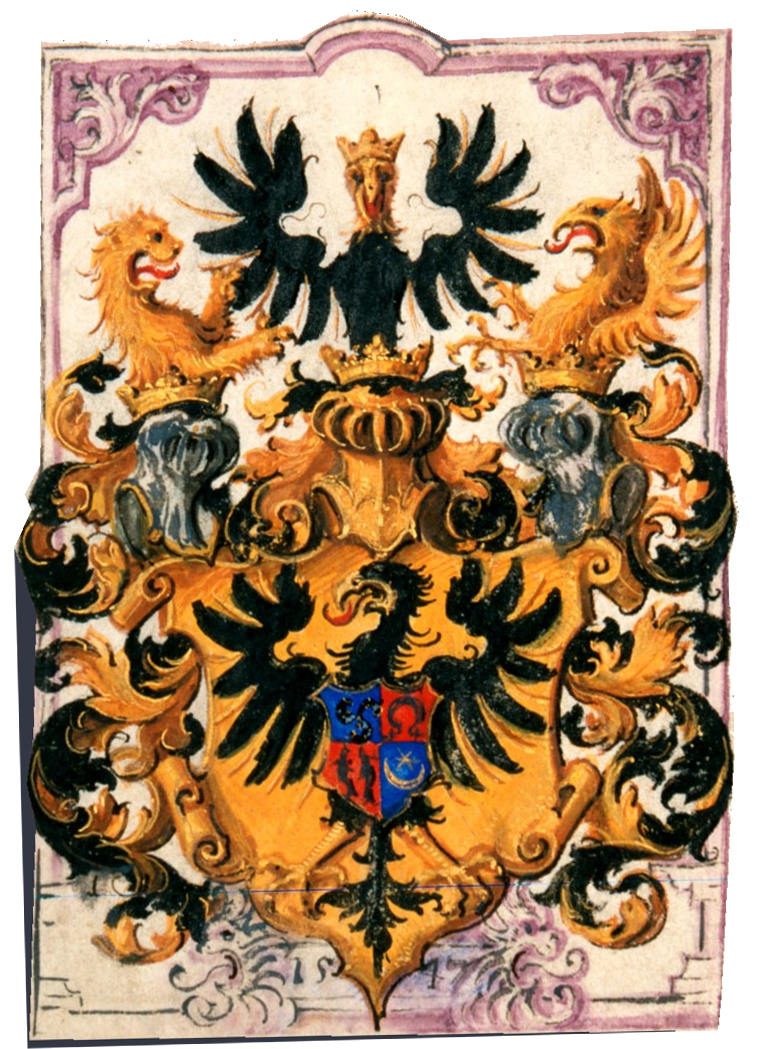
Herb Radziwiłł (Trąby odmiana)

Herb Rawicz

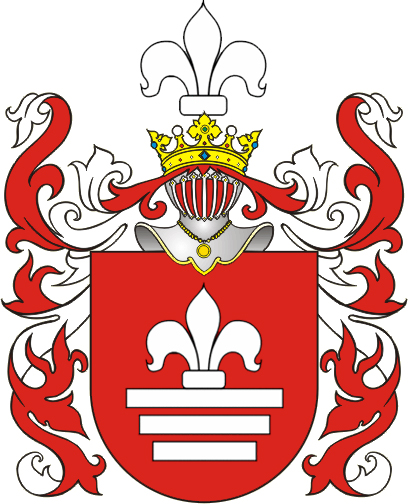
Herb Roch III

Herb Rogala

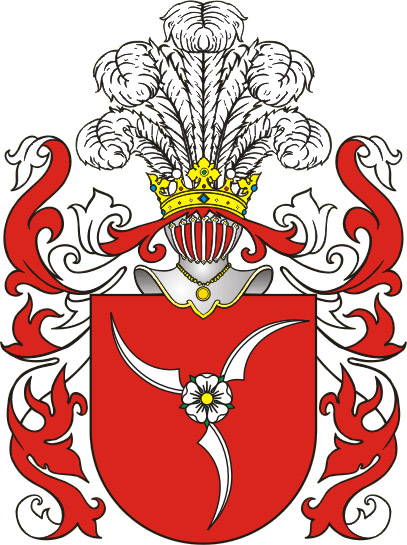
Herb Rola

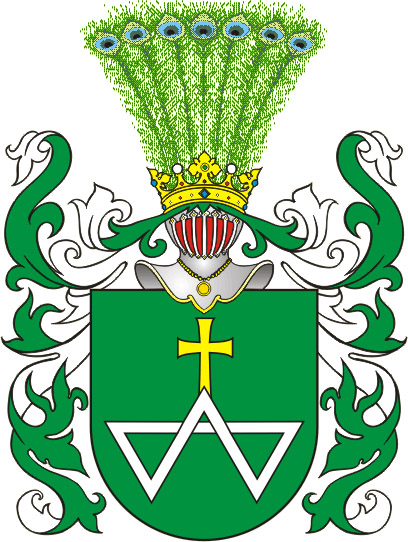
Herb Rozmiar

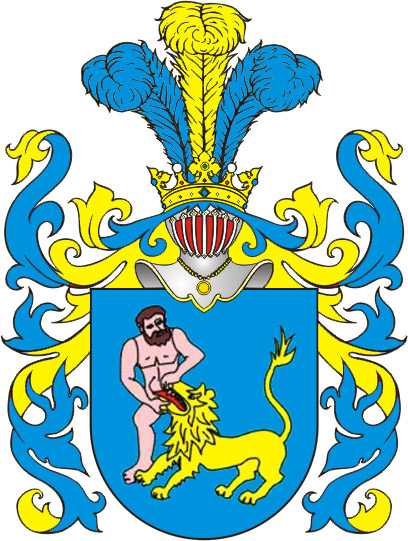
Herb Samson

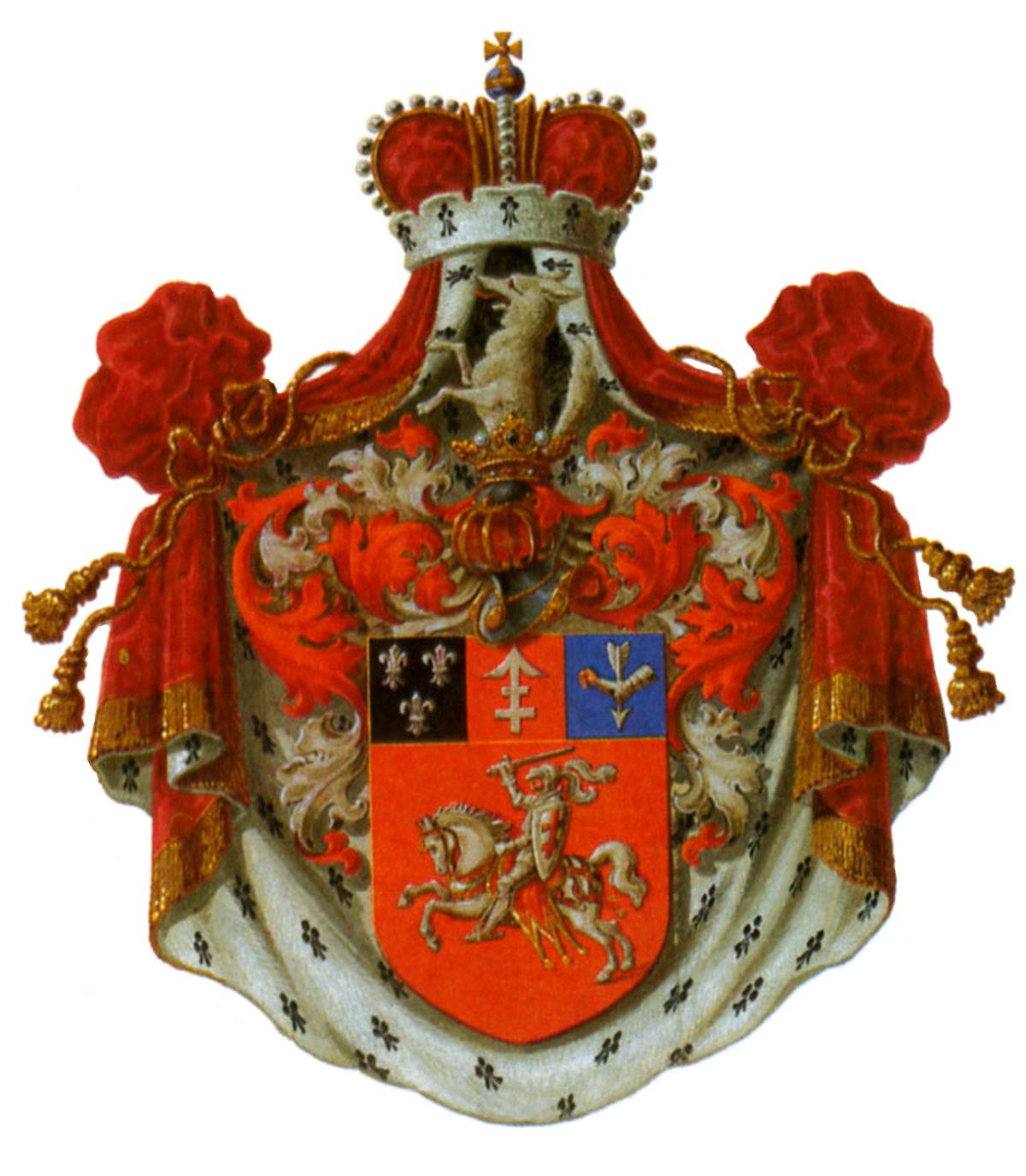
Herb Sapieha (Lis odmiana)

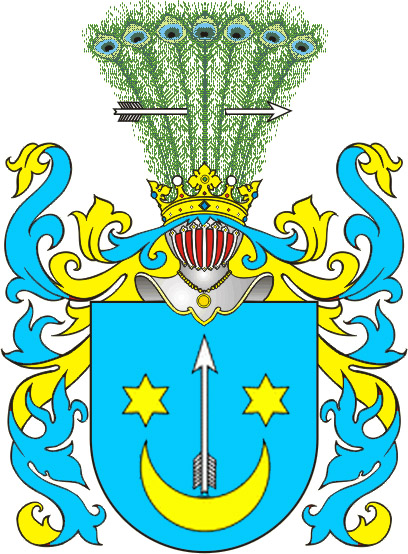
Herb Sas

Sas II

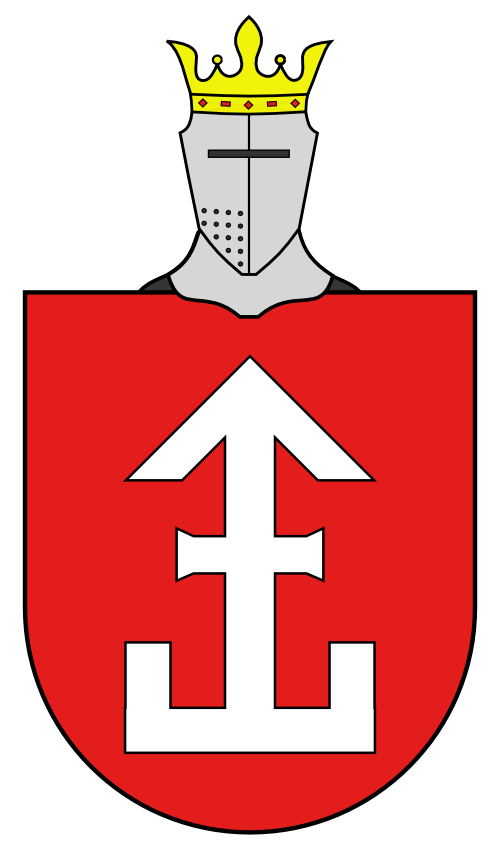
Herb Siekierz

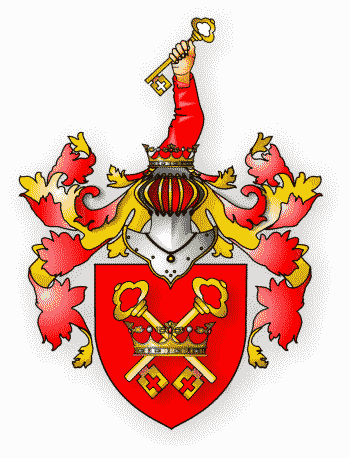
Herb Skarbomierz

Herb Ślepowron (Bujno, Korwin)

Herb Sokoła

Herb Sołtyk

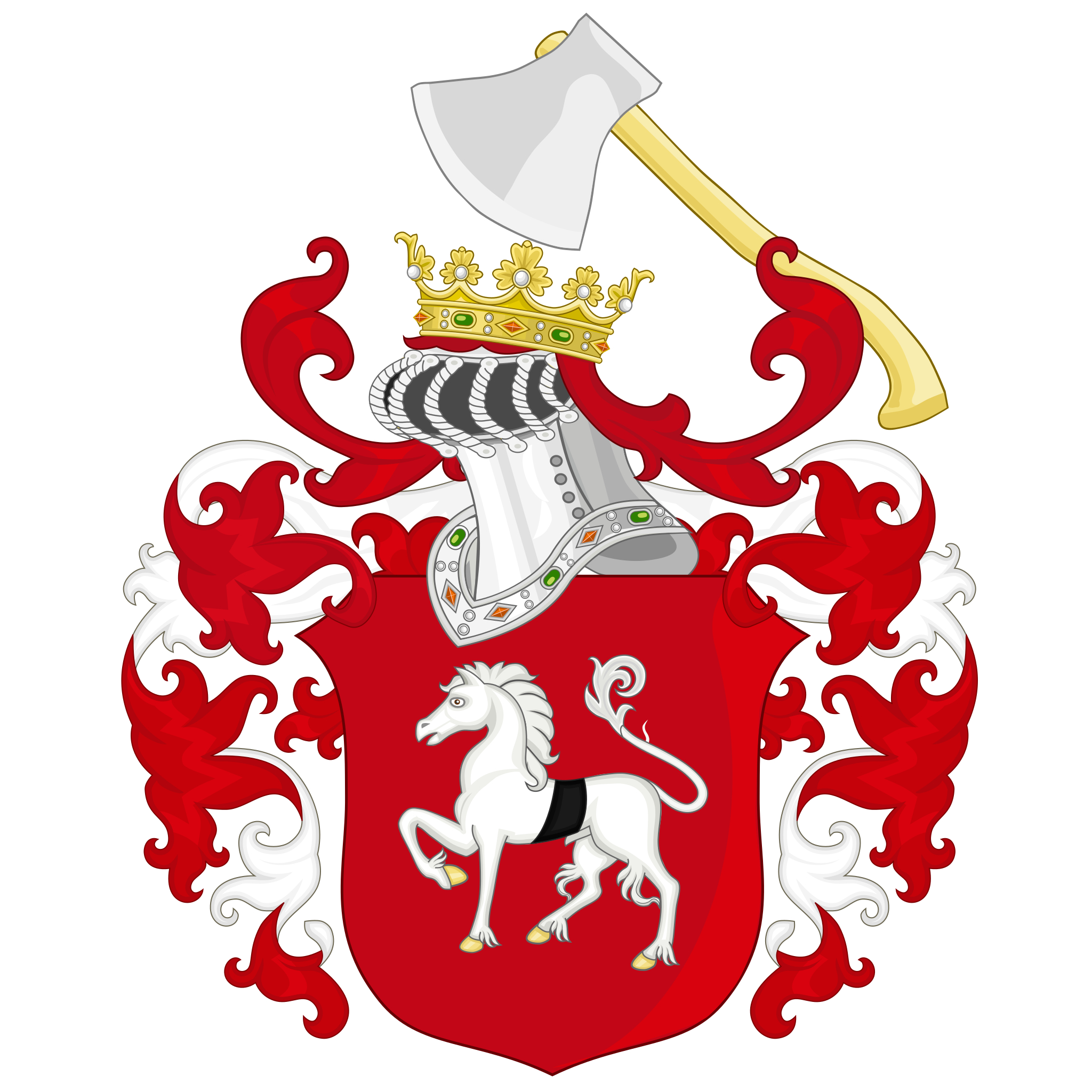
Herb Starykoń

Herb Straszyński

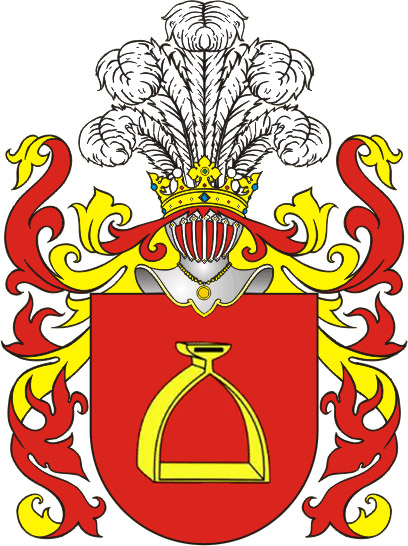
Herb Strzemię

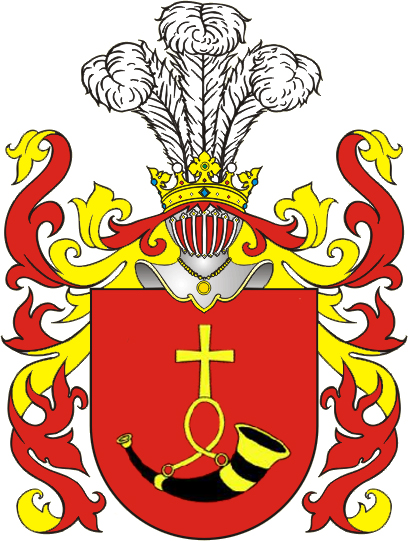
Herb Suchekomnaty

Herb Sulima

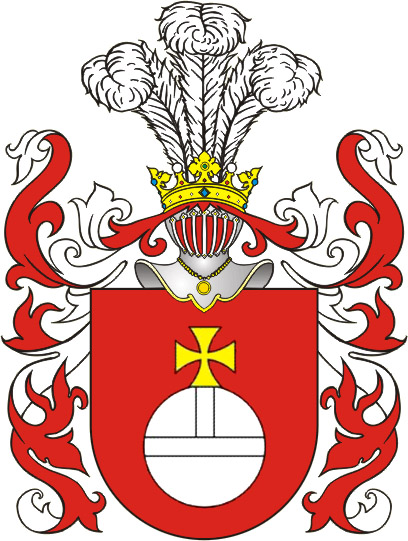
Herb Świąt

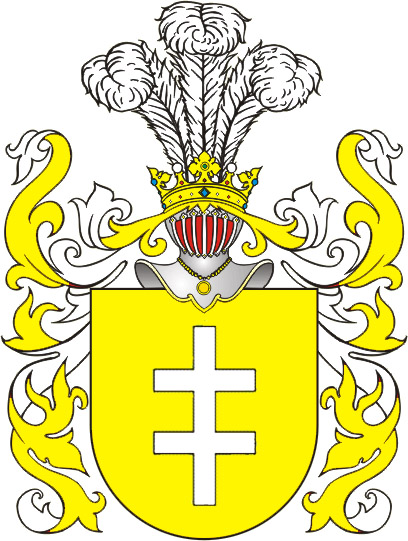
Herb Świeńczyc

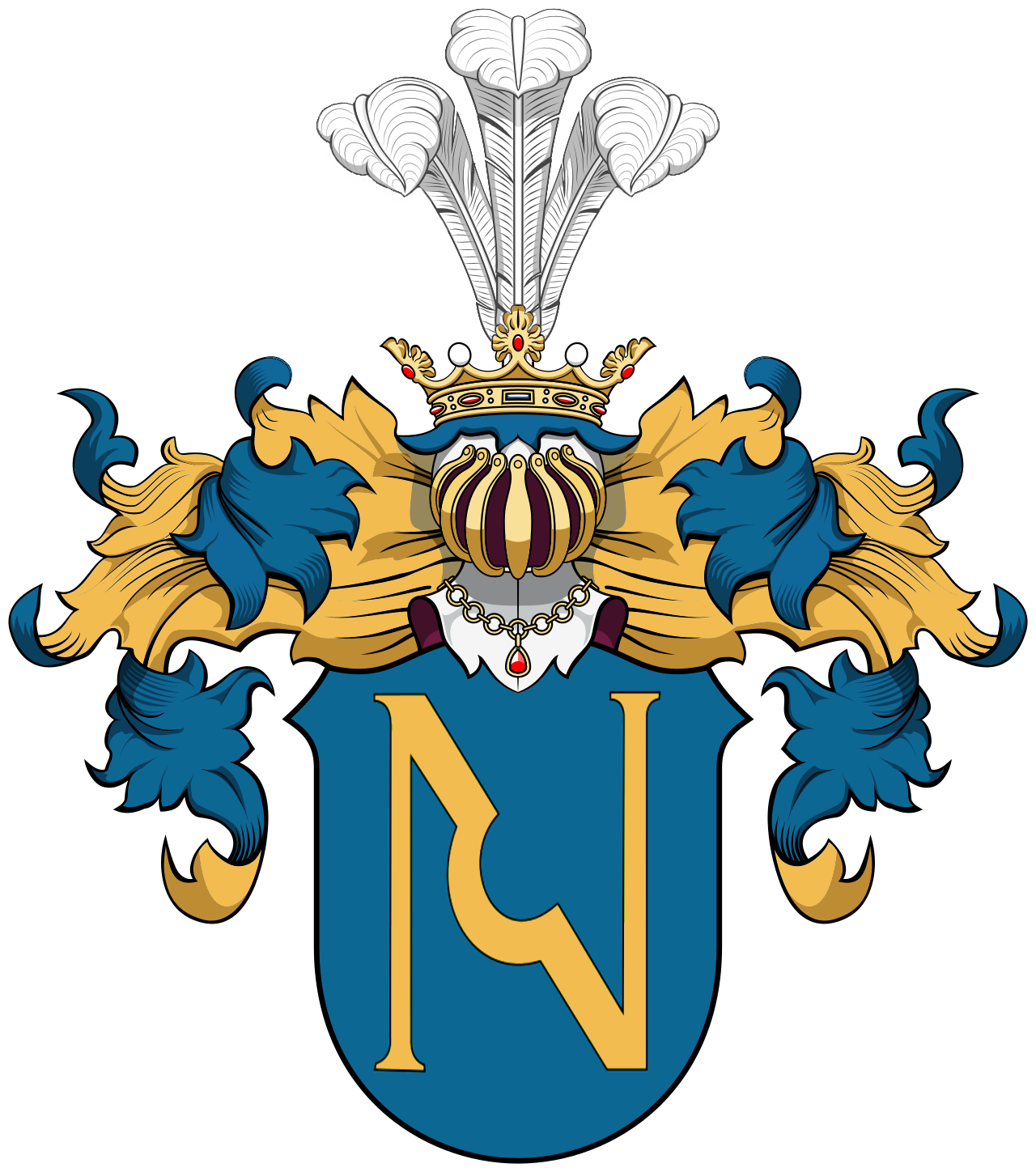
Herb Świerczek

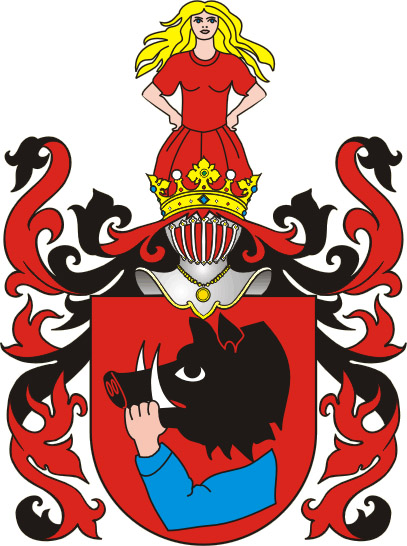
Herb Świnka

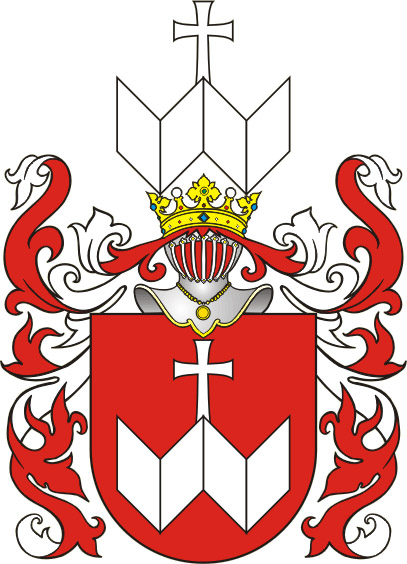
Herb Syrokomla

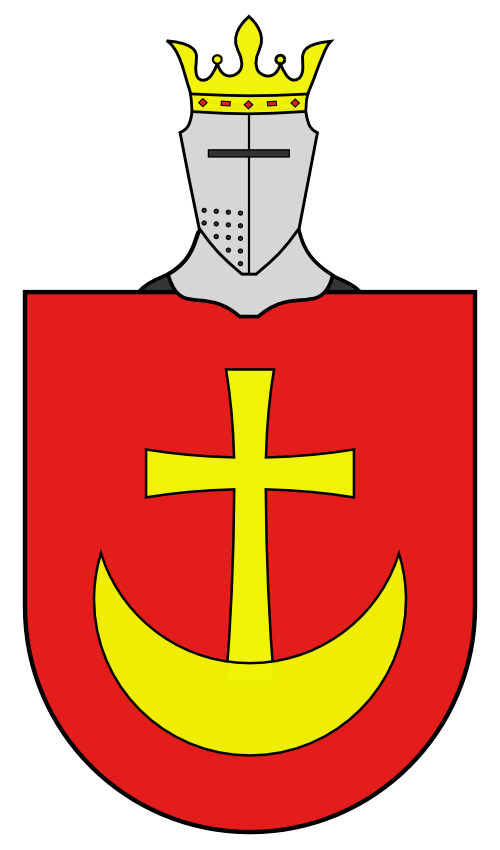
Herb Szeliga

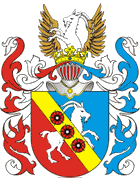
Herb Szembek

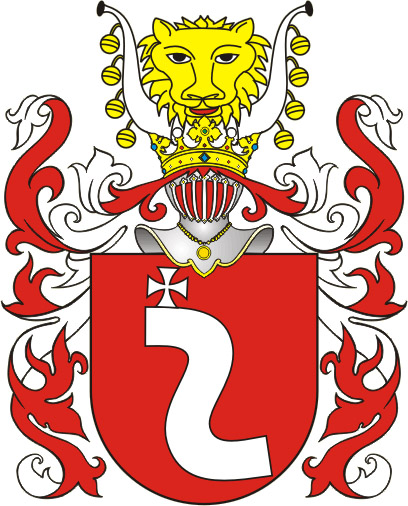
Herb Szreniawa

Herb Tarnawa

Herb Tępa-Podkowa

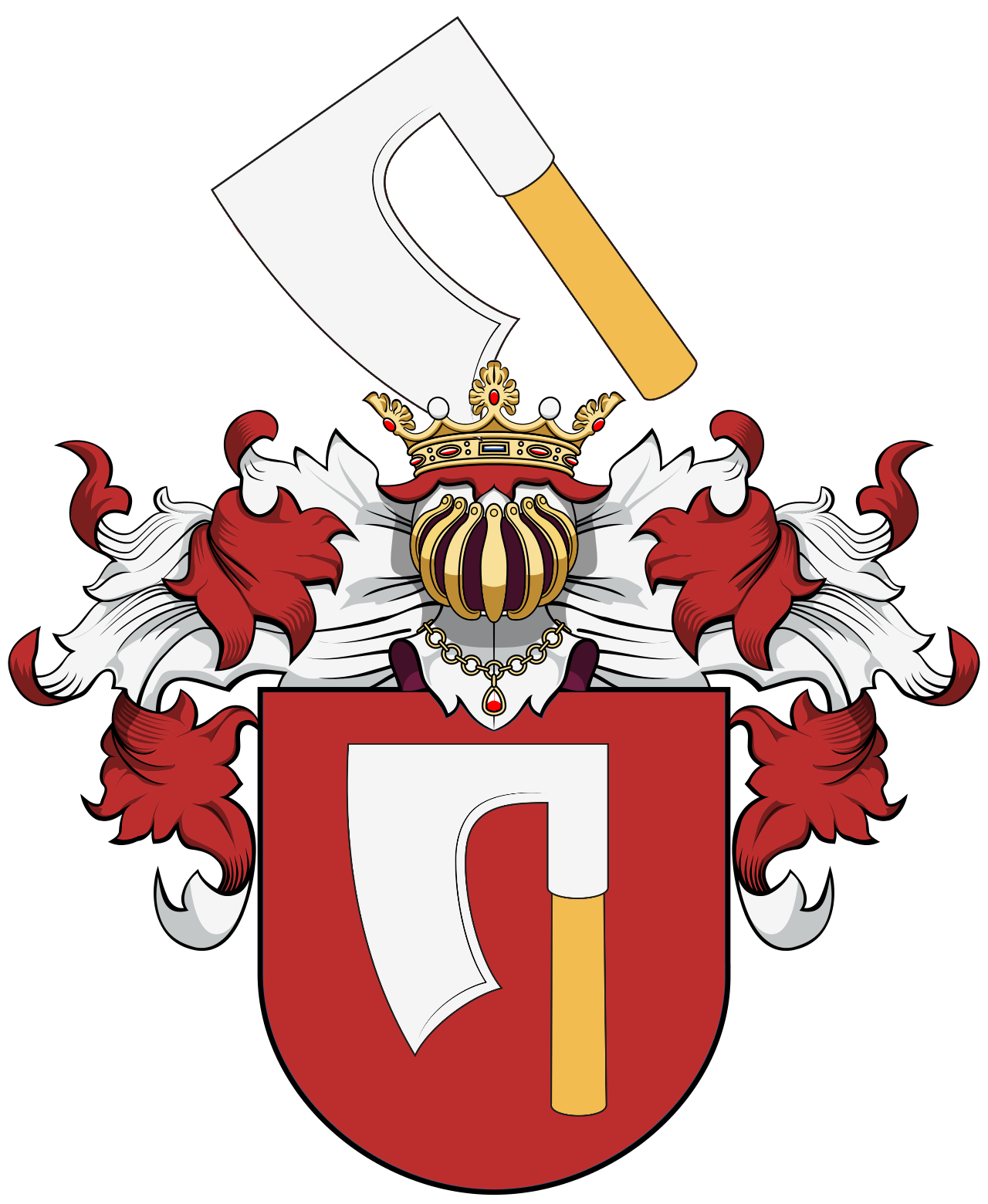
Herb Topór

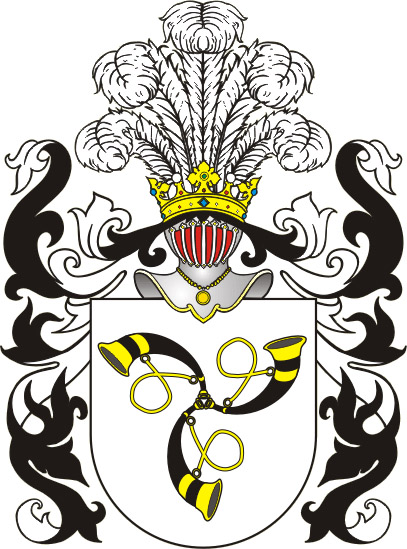
Herb Trąby

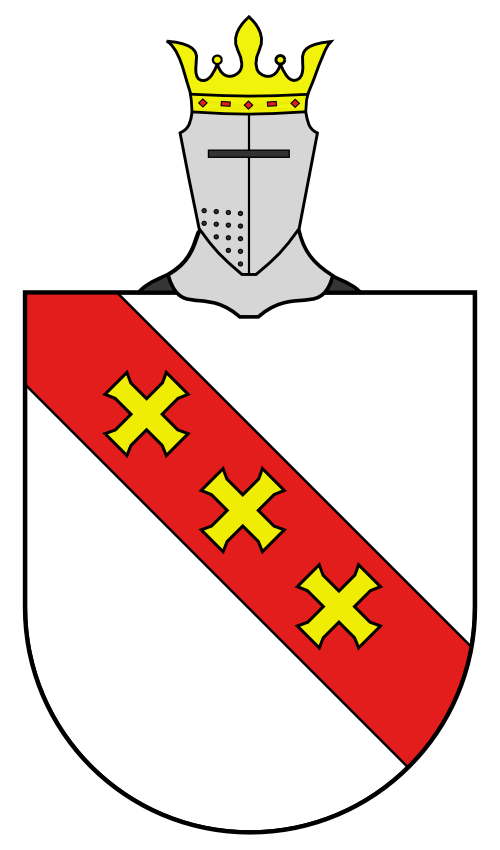
Herb Trestka

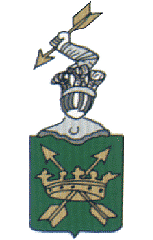
Herb Trójstrzał

Herb Trzaska

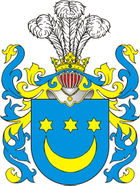
Herb Trzy-Gwiazdy

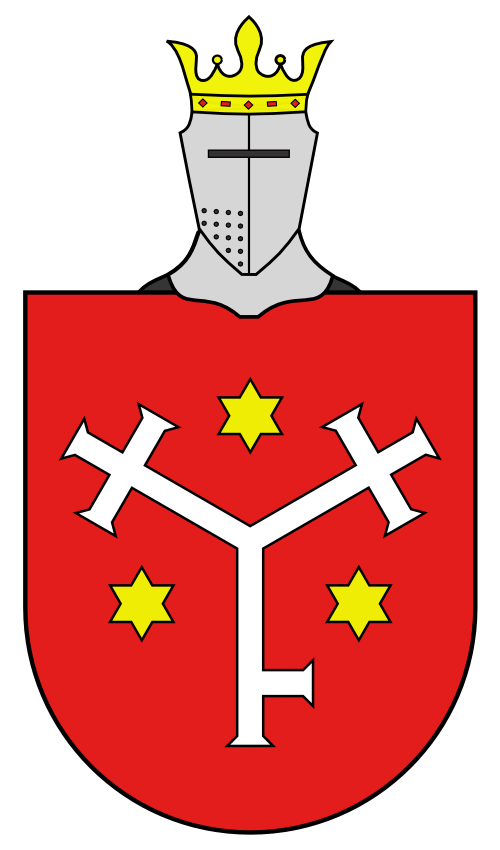
Herb Trzywdar

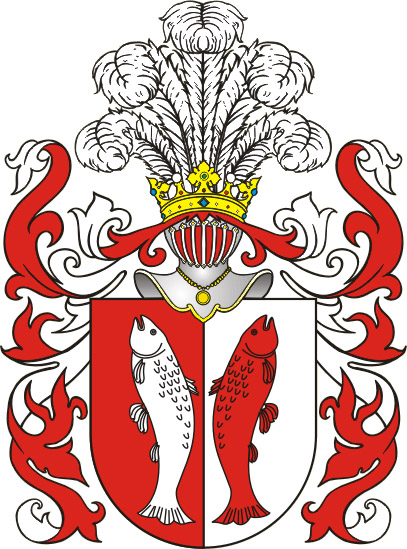
Herb Wadwicz

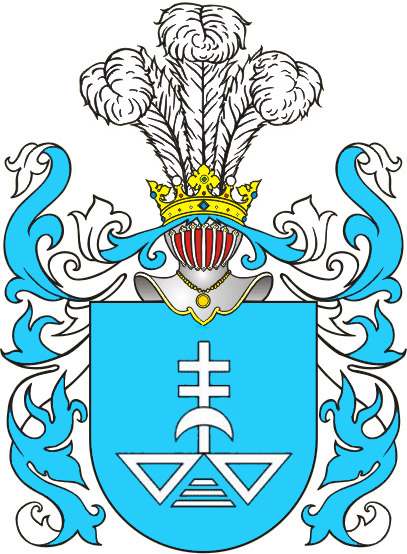
Herb Waga

Herb Warnia

Herb Wąż

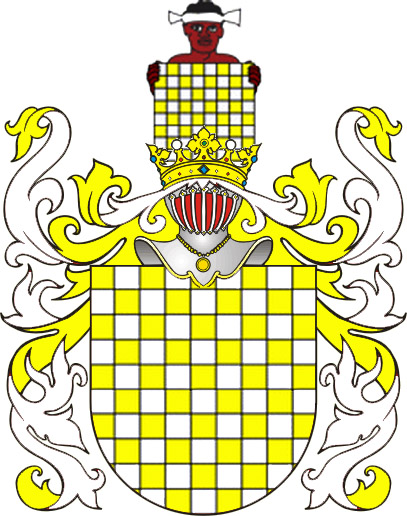
Herb Wczele

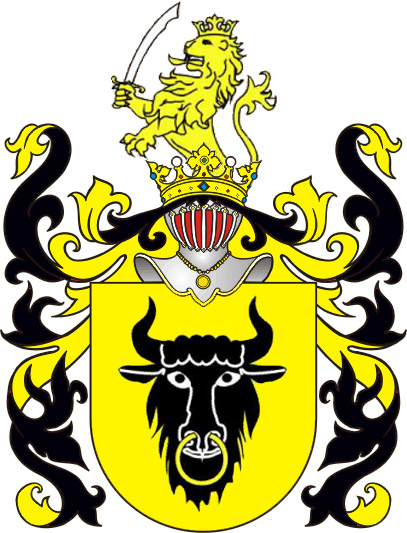
Herb Wieniawa

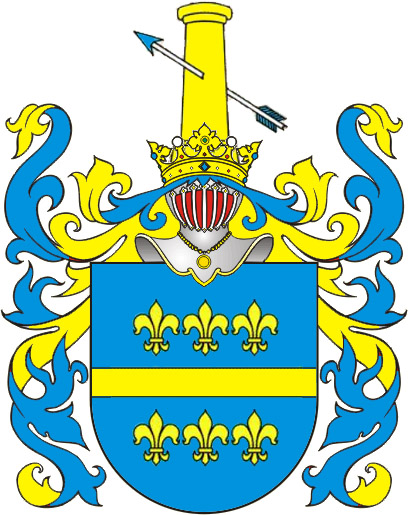
Herb Wierzbna

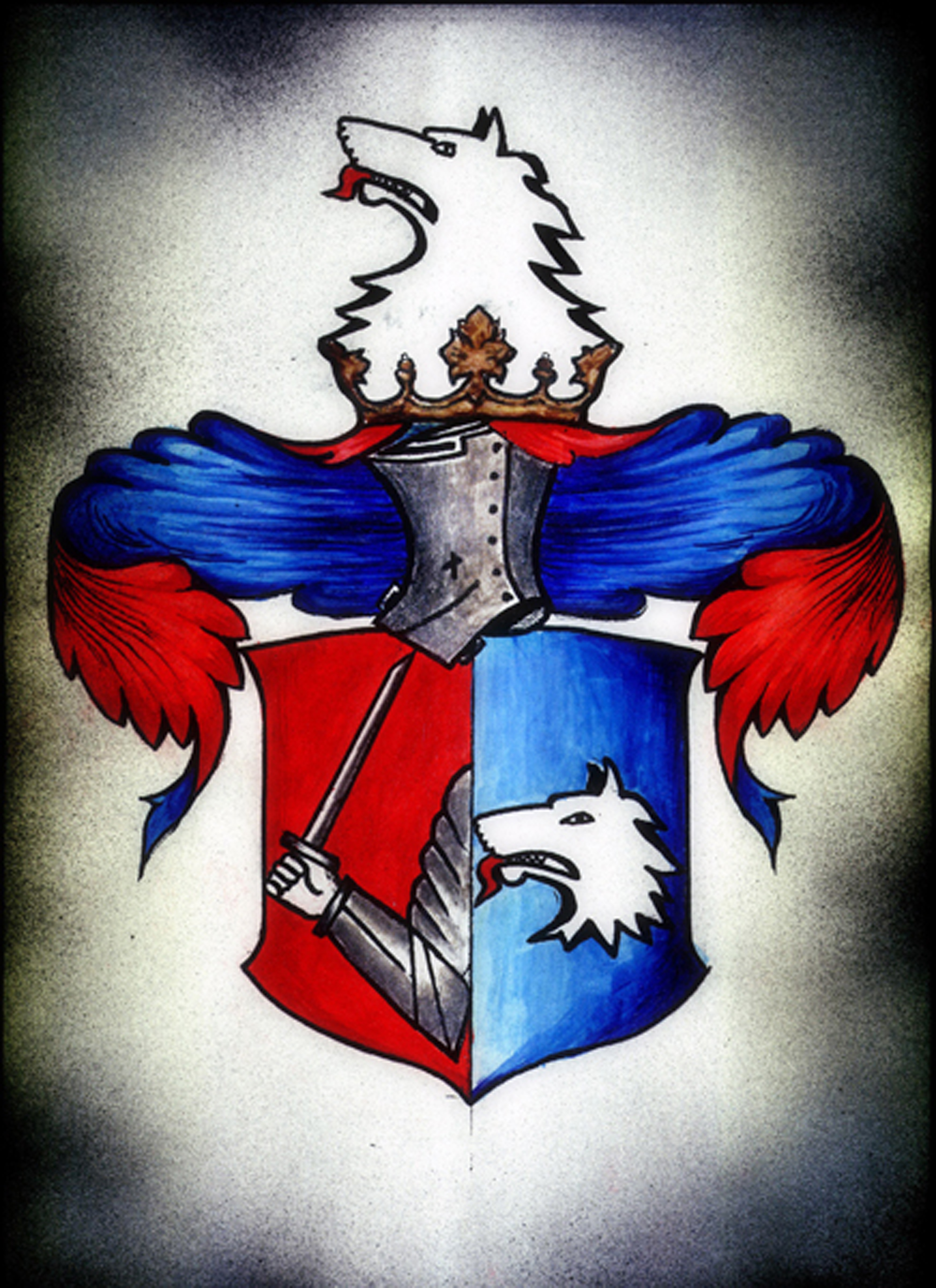
Herb Wilcza-Głowa

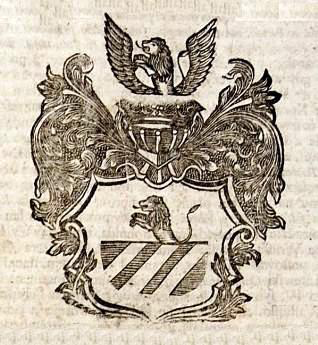
Herb Wolf

Herb Wysocki (Pierzchała/Ostoja)

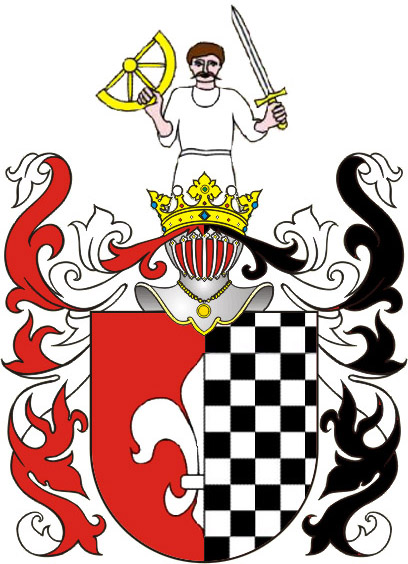
Herb Wyssogota

Herb Zabawa

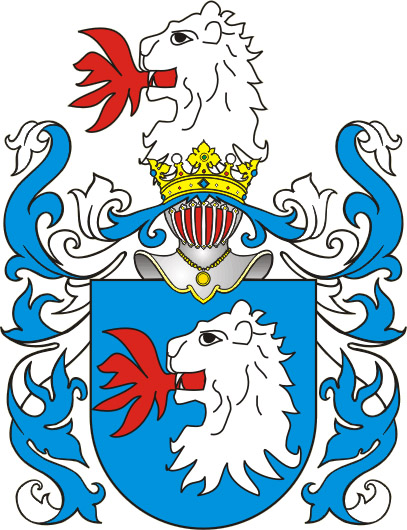
Herb Zadora

Herb Zagłoba

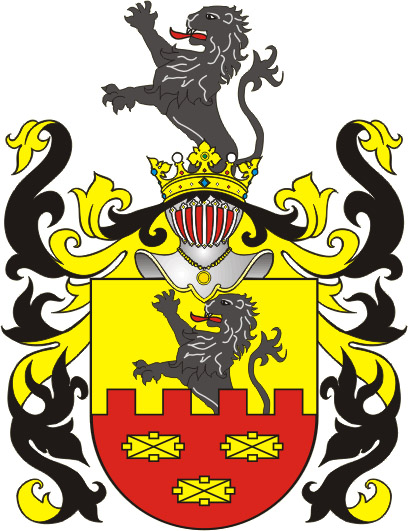
Herb Zaremba

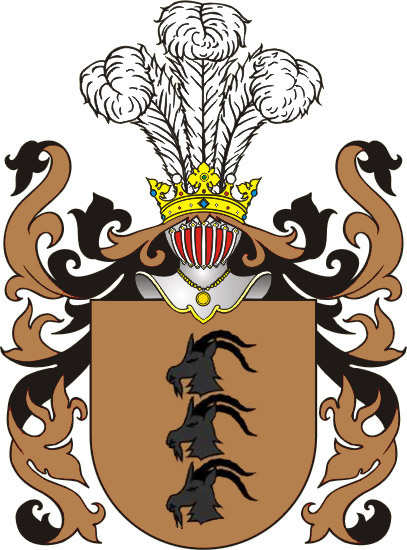
Herb Zerwikaptur

Herb Zetynian

Herb Zgraja (Janina odmiana)

Herb Zych (Záh)

Herb Zychcki (Drzewica II)

Prawdzic

== Images of some personal coat of arms ==
Duke of Masovia Janusz I of Warsaw (c.1340 – 1429)

Prince Józef Antoni Poniatowski coat of arms as Marshal of France

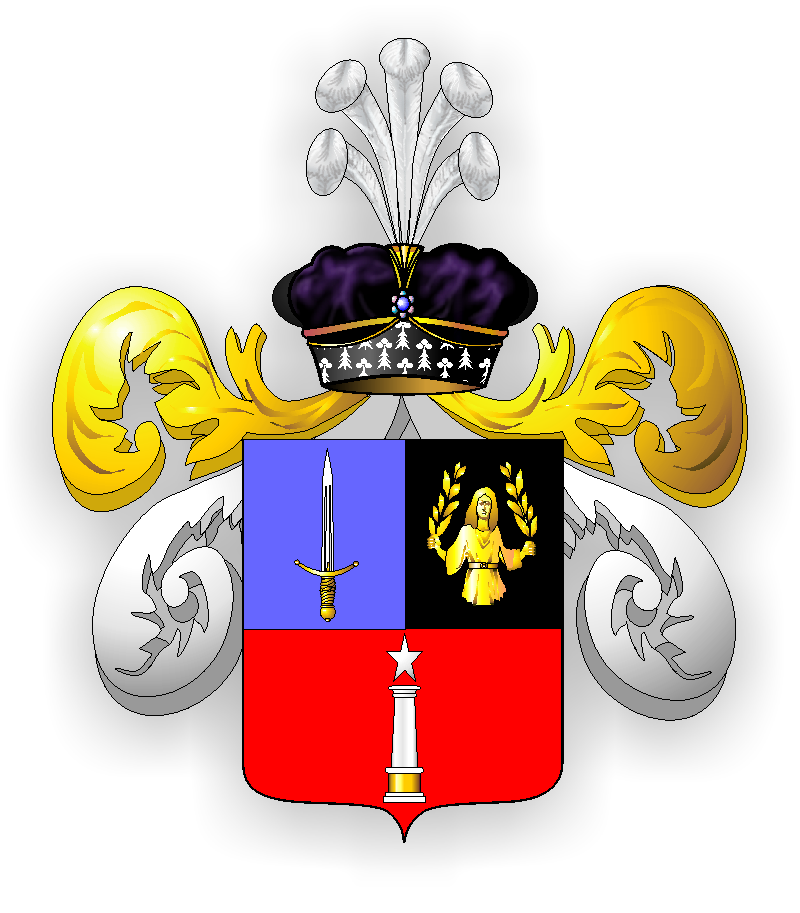
Alexandre Joseph Count Colonna-Walewski coat of arms of the French empire

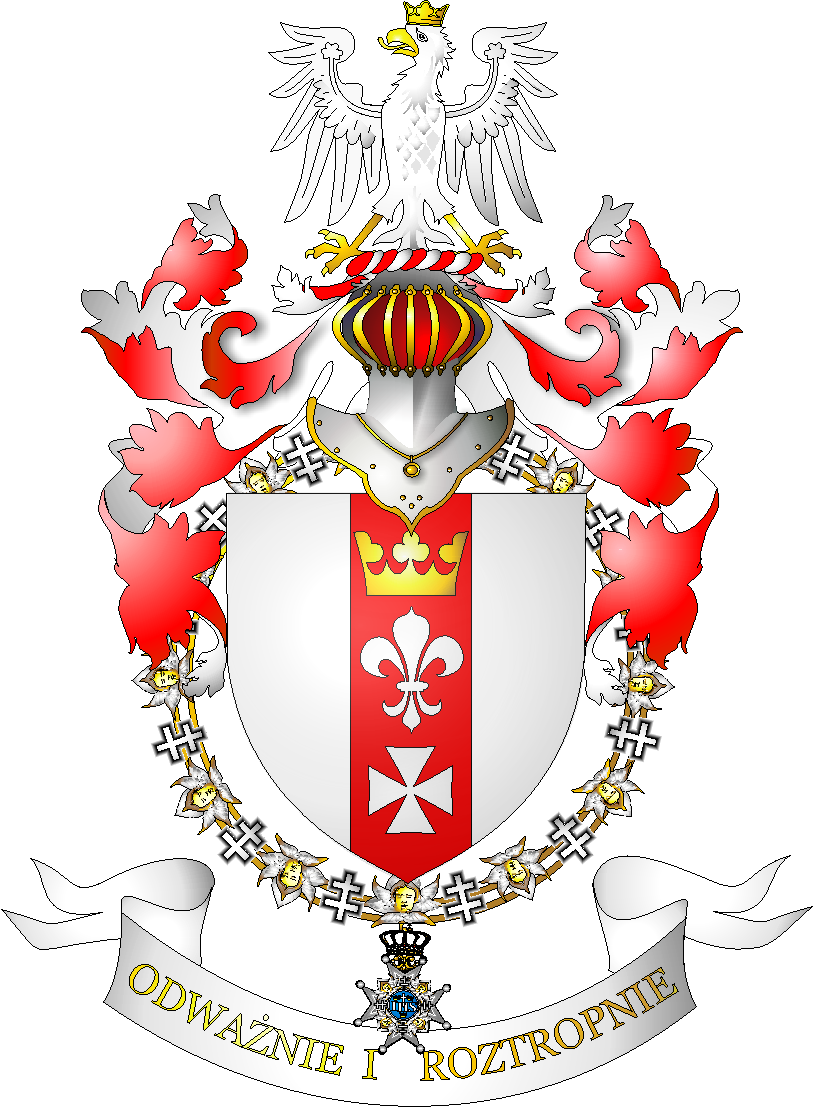
Lech Wałęsa personal granted coat of arms by the Kingdom of Sweden

== See also ==
- Polish heraldry
- Polish name
- Polish clans
- Szlachta
- History of Poland

== Bibliography ==
- Tadeusz Gajl, "Herby szlacheckie Rzeczypospolitej Obojga Narodow", Gdansk, 2003, ISBN 83-88595-12-1
- Polish Coats of Arms listing (Polish)
- Armorial
- J. Lyčkoŭski. "Belarusian Nobility Coats of Arms". (in English)
- Górecki, Piotr (1992), Economy, Society, and Lordship in Medieval Poland: 1100–1250, New York, NEW YORK: Holmes and Meier Publishers, Inc., ISBN 0-8419-1318-8, OCLC 25787903
