= Bełty coat of arms =

Polish coat of arms

Bełty
- Alternative name(s): Bełcz, Bolc
- Earliest mention: 1412
- Towns: none
- Families: Boltz, Kierdej, Januszowski, Graniewski, Grambiewski, Cirisser, Chorowski, Choroszewski, Belt, Chochoński, Łata, Bergielski, Bergielewicz, Bergayło, Berends, Beneszko, Benedyktowicz, Bełt or Bełtowicz, Chochorowski, Radziwanowski, Wolszleger, Śniechowski, Śmi(ie)chowski, Strzelnicki, Stradecki, Skoropadski, Rembowski, Kolędowski, Radziwonowski, Kudere(o)wski, Późniak, Pożniak, Pożaryc(s)ki, Potorzycki, Potarczycki, Połonicki, Pelicki, Zwierkowski, Radziwoński, Radziwinowski

Bełty is a Polish coat of arms.

== Gallery ==
Bełty II (odm.)

Kolenda (odm.)

Piliński (odm.)

== See also ==
- Polish heraldry
- Heraldic family
- List of Polish nobility coats of arms

== Bibliography ==
- Tadeusz Gajl: Herbarz polski od średniowiecza do XX wieku : ponad 4500 herbów szlacheckich 37 tysięcy nazwisk 55 tysięcy rodów. L&L, 2007. ISBN 978-83-60597-10-1.
