= Trestka coat of arms =

Polish coat of arms

Trestka
- Families: 4 names Luszkowski, Trestka, Trop, Zembowski

Trestka is a Polish coat of arms. It was used by several szlachta families in the times of the Polish–Lithuanian Commonwealth.

== Notable bearers ==
Notable bearers of this coat of arms include:

== Variants ==
Coat of arms of the Cieleski family.

== See also ==
- Polish heraldry
- Heraldic family
- List of Polish nobility coats of arms

== Bibliography ==
- Juliusz Ostrowski, Księga herbowa rodów polskich. Warszawa 1897
- Tadeusz Gajl: Herbarz polski od średniowiecza do XX wieku : ponad 4500 herbów szlacheckich 37 tysięcy nazwisk 55 tysięcy rodów. L&L, 2007. ISBN 978-83-60597-10-1.
