= Grabowiec coat of arms =

Polish coat of arms

Grabowiec
- Earliest mention: 1843
- Towns: none
- Families: Henke, Felisiak

Grabowiec is a Polish coat of arms.

== History ==
It was used by the Henke and Felisiak szlachta families in the times of Congress Poland.

== Notable bearers ==
Notable bearers of this coat of arms include:

- Gustav Henke

== See also ==
- Polish heraldry
- Heraldic family
- List of Polish nobility coats of arms

== Sources ==
- {pol} Polska Encyklopedia Szlachecka. Warszawa 1935 r., tom II, s.171
