= Bojcza coat of arms =

Polish coat of arms

Bojcza
- Alternative names: Boycza, Modzel, Modzele, Modzelie, Piaseczna, Piasnicza, błędnie - Świeńczyc
- Earliest mention: 1453
- Towns: none

Bojcza is a Polish coat of arms. It was used by several szlachta families.

== Notable bearers ==
Notable bearers of this coat of arms include: Zwolinski

== See also ==
- Polish heraldry
- Heraldic family
- List of Polish nobility coats of arms

== Bibliography ==
- Kasper Niesiecki, Jan Nepomucen Bobrowicz: Herbarz polski Kaspra Niesieckiego S. J. T. 3. Lipsk: Breitkopf i Haertel, 1841, s. 262.
- Tadeusz Gajl: Herbarz polski od średniowiecza do XX wieku : ponad 4500 herbów szlacheckich 37 tysięcy nazwisk 55 tysięcy rodów. L&L, 2007. ISBN 978-83-60597-10-1.
- Józef Szymański: Herbarz średniowiecznego rycerstwa polskiego. Warszawa: PWN, 1993, s. 190. ISBN 83-01-09797-3.
- Józef Szymański: Herbarz rycerstwa polskiego z XVI wieku. Warszawa: DiG, 2001, s. 178. ISBN 83-7181-217-5.
