= Czernina (disambiguation) =

Czernina is a type of Polish soup.

Czernina may also refer to the following places in Poland:

- Czernina, Lower Silesian Voivodeship
- Czernina Górna, Gmina Góra, within Góra County, Lower Silesian Voivodeship
- Czernina Dolna, Gmina Góra, within Góra County, Lower Silesian Voivodeship

== See also ==
- Czernin family
