= Bajbuza coat of arms =

Polish coat of arms

Bajbuza
- Battle cry: -
- Alternative name: Baybuza
- Earliest mention: 1590
- Towns: none
- Families: 8 altogether: Ambrożewicz, Bajbuza, Baybuza, Benkuski, Hrybunowicz, Kostrowski, Strybunowicz, Woynicz

Bajbuza is a Polish coat of arms. It was used by several szlachta families in the times of the Polish–Lithuanian Commonwealth.

== Notable bearers ==
Notable bearers of this coat of arms include:

== See also ==
- Polish heraldry
- Heraldic family
- List of Polish nobility coats of arms

== Bibliography ==
- http://pl.wikisource.org/wiki/Encyklopedia_staropolska/Bajbuza
