= Alemani coat of arms =

Polish coat of arms

Alemani
- Alternative names: Alamani, Alameni, Allemani
- Earliest mention: 1455
- Families: 4 names Alamenus, Alemani, Limanowski, Rudelewicz

Alemani is a Polish nobility coat of arms originated from Italy.

== History ==
The Alemani coat of arms was a family crest brought to Poland from Italy by Dominik Allemani who received an Indygenat (recognition of foreign status as a noble) from King of Poland Zygmunt August on 19 April 1566. Dominik Allemani became a stolnik of Lublin and starost of Nowe Miasto

== Blazon ==
Azure, two bends or impaling argent three pellets two and one. Crest: issuant from a crest coronet or a demi-maiden habited azure, crined or, wearing a wreath vert and holding in her dexter hand a wreath of the same, her sinister hand resting on her hip. Mantled dexter or and azure, sinister sable and argent.

== Notable bearers ==
Notable bearers of this Coat of Arms include:

- Dominik Alemani

== See also ==
- Polish heraldry
- Heraldic family
- List of Polish nobility coats of arms

== Bibliography ==
- Józef Szymański: Herbarz rycerstwa polskiego z XVI wieku. Warszawa: DiG, 2001. ISBN 83-7181-217-5. str. 7
- Barbara Trelińska: Album armorum nobilium Regni Poloniae XV-XVIII saec.. Lublin: Uniwersytet Marii Curie-Skłodowskiej, 2001. ISBN 83-227-1715-6. str. 151-152
- Tadeusz Gajl: Herbarz polski od średniowiecza do XX wieku : ponad 4500 herbów szlacheckich 37 tysięcy nazwisk 55 tysięcy rodów. L&L, 2007. ISBN 978-83-60597-10-1.
