= Świat coat of arms =

Polish coat of arms

Świat
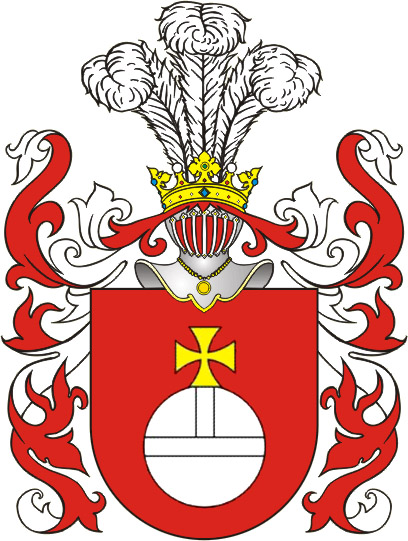
- Earliest mention: unknown
- Towns: none

Świat (Polish for "World") is a Polish coat of arms. It was used by several szlachta (noble) families under the Polish–Lithuanian Commonwealth.

== Notable bearers ==
Notable bearers of this coat of arms have included:

== See also ==
- Polish heraldry
- Heraldry
- Coat of arms
