= Świeńczyc coat of arms =

Polish coat of arms

Swieńczyc
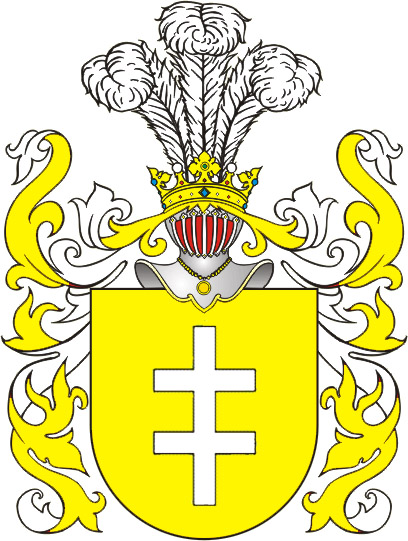
- Earliest mention: unknown
- Towns: none

Swieńczyc is a Polish Coat of Arms. It was used by several szlachta families in the times of the Polish–Lithuanian Commonwealth.

== Notable bearers ==
Notable bearers of this Coat of Arms include:

- Stalewski
- Grabiański
- Święcki

== See also ==
- Polish heraldry
- Heraldry
- Coat of Arms
