= Brzuska coat of arms =

Polish coat of arms

Brzuska
- Earliest mention: unknown
- Towns: none
- Families: Brzuska

Brzuska is a Polish coat of arms. It was used by the Brzuska family from the Ruthenian Voivodeship.

== Notable bearers ==
Notable bearers of this coat of arms include:

== See also ==
- Polish heraldry
- Heraldry
- Coat of arms
