= Wierzbna coat of arms =

Polish coat of arms

Wierzbna
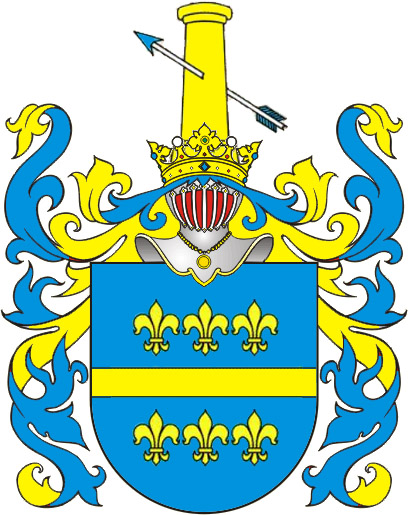
- Alternative name: Wierzbno
- Earliest mention: 1261
- Towns: none
- Families: Brantalski, Fiedorowicz, Laszczyński, Łaszczyński, Łaszczyński de Verbno, Pawłowski, Rydzeński, Rydzyński, Słonczyński, Wendorff, Wierzbna, Wierzwiński

Wierzbna is a Polish coat of arms. It was used by several szlachta families in the times of the Polish–Lithuanian Commonwealth.

== Notable bearers ==
Notable bearers of this coat of arms include:

- Jan de Czernina - starosta of Wschowa and Kościan, castellan of Międzyrzecz
- Henryk de Wierzbno - canon of Wrocław

== See also ==
- Polish heraldry
- Heraldry
- Coat of arms
