= Trzy Gwiazdy coat of arms =

Polish coat of arms

Trzy Gwiazdy
- Earliest mention: unknown
- Towns: none
- Families: 19 names altogether: Brychta, Dobrowolski, Genderzika, Inés de León, Juszczakiewicz, Jutrzenka, Lanik, Madricki, Malaff, Milwiński, Olechowski, Pluta, Polpanke, Pomorski, Słuczanowski, Styp, Szyc, Wańtoch, Wrześniewski

Trzy Gwiazdy (Polish for "Three Stars") is a Polish coat of arms. It was used by several szlachta (noble) families under the Polish–Lithuanian Commonwealth.

== Notable bearers ==
Notable bearers of this coat of arms have included:

- "Inés" and "de León" (Heraldaria)

== See also ==
- Polish heraldry
- Heraldry
- Coat of Arms
- List of Polish nobility coats of arms
- Dynastic Genealogy
- Ornatowski.com
