= Gryzima coat of arms =

Polish coat of arms

Gryzima
- Alternative names: Borek, Bork, Gryzina, Gryżna, Lupus, Wilki
- Earliest mention: 1396
- Families: Bork, Dulski, Gostyński, Gryzima, Gryziński, Gryzyński, Jaszkowski, Lincz, Maliński, Płaszkowski, Starzyński, Weyzenburg, Włoszczowski

Gryzima is a Polish coat of arms. It was used by several szlachta families in the times of the Polish–Lithuanian Commonwealth.

== See also ==
- Polish heraldry
- Heraldry
- Coat of arms
- List of Polish nobility coats of arms

== Sources ==
- Dynastic Genealogy
- Ornatowski.com
- Nieznana szlachta polska i jej herby - Wiktor Wittyg
