= Gwiaździcz coat of arms =

Polish coat of arms

Gwiaździcz
- Families: Brykczyński

Gwiaździcz is a Polish coat of arms. It was used by several szlachta families in the times of the Polish–Lithuanian Commonwealth.

== Notable bearers ==
Notable bearers of this coat of arms include:

- Antoni Brykczyński

== See also ==
- Polish heraldry
- Heraldry
- Coat of arms
- List of Polish nobility coats of arms

== Sources ==
- Dynastic Genealogy
