= Pół Orła coat of arms =

Polish coat of arms

Pół Orła
- Alternative names: Orlica, Paczko, Paczek
- Earliest mention: 1561
- Towns: none
- Families: Fornalski, Freikier, Golewicz, Gojlewicz, Niemorszański, Pacewicz, Packiewicz, Paczak, Paczek, Paczko, Stybich, Stybicz

Pół Orła is a Polish coat of arms. It was used by several noble families in the times of the Polish–Lithuanian Commonwealth.

== Notable bearers ==
Notable bearers of this coat of arms include:

- Jan Paczko

== Sources ==
- Tadeusz Gajl: Herbarz polski od średniowiecza do XX wieku : ponad 4500 herbów szlacheckich 37 tysięcy nazwisk 55 tysięcy rodów. L&L, 2007, s. 279. ISBN 978-83-60597-10-1.
- Andrzej Brzezina Winiarski: Herby Rzeczypospolitej. Przemyśl: 2008. ISBN 978-83-88172-28-1

== See also ==
- Polish heraldry
- Heraldry
- Coat of arms
