= Czernin (disambiguation) =

The Czernin family is a noble family originating in Bohemia.

Czernin may also refer to the following places in Poland:

- Czernin, Pomeranian Voivodeship
- Czernin, West Pomeranian Voivodeship

== See also ==
- Czernina (disambiguation)
