= Groty coat of arms =

Polish coat of arms

Groty
- Earliest mention: unknown
- Towns: none
- Families: Grot, Grott, Gruzdź, Paszkowicz, Prokopowicz, Razowdowski, Waszklewicz, Włocki

Groty (Polish for "Spearheads") is a Polish coat of arms. It was used by several szlachta (noble) families under the Polish–Lithuanian Commonwealth.

== See also ==
- Polish heraldry
- Heraldry
- Coat of arms
- List of Polish nobility coats of arms

== Sources ==
- Dynastic Genealogy
