= Nagana szlachectwa =

Legal procedure in Polish-Lithuanian Commonwealth

Nagana szlachectwa (Latin: 'Vituperatio nobilitatis'), literally reprobation/reprimand/censure of nobility, also translated by Norman Davies as Test of Nobility was a legal procedure of the revocation of nobility in the Polish–Lithuanian Commonwealth.

== Description ==
Due to the absence of formalized heraldry laws and lineage in early Poland, nobility of a person was tested in a regular court. The confirmation of nobility was based on calling for a certain number of witnesses. In Poland this was in accordance with the 1633 statute, in Lithuania by Chapter 3, Article 22 of the 1588 Statute. The latter demanded two witnesses each from the maternal and paternal side. The penalty for perjury was being stripped of one's own szlachta status, by the Constitution of 1601.

In case of the successful nagana, the accuser earned up to half of the property of the accused, with the other half going to the state. The justice was highly prone to miscarriage, in particular, to abusive ennoblement Therefore, this procedure was gradually restricted in various ways. After 1581, the procedures took place before either the Crown Tribunal or the Lithuanian Tribunal.

Norman Davies conjectures that this practice was among the factors leading to the establishment of a unique Polish practice of heraldic clans. It is also asserted that this practice led to development of extensive personal archiving and archive research among Polish nobility.

== See also ==
- Dérogeance
