= Mądrostki coat of arms =

Polish coat of arms

Mądrostki
- Battle cry: Śmiara
- Alternative names: Śmiara, Śmiera, Zmiara
- Earliest mention: 1302
- Towns: none
- Families: 17 names altogether: Bąbelski, Berdowski, Borzniewski, Borzniowski, Bydliński, Chobęcki, Galowski, Golecki, Gołecki, Kruszyna, Lissowski, Małyszczycki, Mądrostka, Mądroszkiewicz, Wielkanocki, Wielkonocki, Wilczek

Mądrostki is a Polish coat of arms. It was used by several szlachta families in the times of the Polish–Lithuanian Commonwealth.

== History ==
Earliest found mention is as of 1302.

== Notable bearers ==
Notable bearers of this coat of arms include: 1. Rodzina Mądrych (Mądry)

== See also ==
- Polish heraldry
- Heraldry
- Coat of Arms
- List of Polish nobility coats of arms
