= Wilcza Głowa coat of arms =

Polish coat of arms

Wilcza Głowa
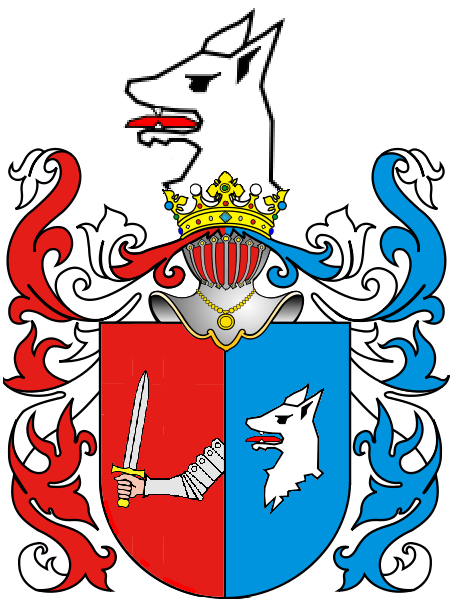
- Alternative names: Klejna, Kleyna, Kleyn
- Earliest mention: 1662
- Families: Klejna, Wilk, Wilkaniec

Wilcza Głowa ("Wolf's Head") is a Polish coat of arms. It was used by several szlachta families of the Kingdom of Poland and Grand Duchy of Lithuania, and later in the times of the Polish–Lithuanian Commonwealth.

== Notable bearers ==
Notable bearers of this coat of arms include:

- Sean Edward Mikolaj Jelenkiewicz (American Banker)

== See also ==
- Polish heraldry
- Heraldry
- Coat of arms
- List of Polish nobility coats of arms
