= Coat of arms of Katowice =

Polish coat of arms

- Cities: Katowice

The coat of arms of Katowice is a Polish coat of arms and one of the official municipal symbols of the city of Katowice, Poland.

== See also ==
- Katowice
- Polish heraldry
