= Kietlicz coat of arms =

Polish coat of arms

Kietlicz
- Alternative names: Kiczka, Kyczka, Kitschka
- Families: Brem, Cygan, Kietlicz, Owelt, Owilski, Pilli, Pluzeński, Preteszewski, Preteszowski, Przedwolszowski, Rajmir, Rajski, Rayski, Skedziński, Skidziński, Skiedeński, Skierkowski, Stresz, Studeński, Zagan, Zigan

Kietlicz is a Polish coat of arms. It was used by several szlachta families in the times of the Polish–Lithuanian Commonwealth.

== History ==
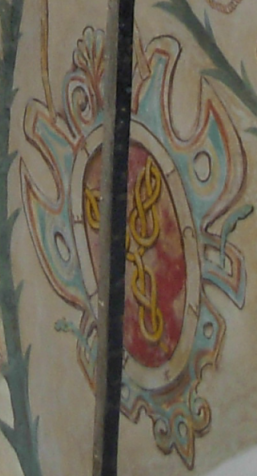
Kietlicz coat of arms in Baranów Sandomierski castle

== Notable bearers ==
Notable bearers of this coat of arms include:

== See also ==
- Polish heraldry
- Heraldry
- Coat of arms
- List of Polish nobility coats of arms

== Sources ==
- Dynastic Genealogy
- Ornatowski.com
