= Polanowo =

Polanowo may refer to the following places in Poland:

- Polanowo, Lower Silesian Voivodeship (south-west Poland)
- Polanowo, Piła County in Greater Poland Voivodeship (west-central Poland)
- Polanowo, Słupca County in Greater Poland Voivodeship (west-central Poland)
