= Strumyk =

Strumyk may refer to the following places in Poland:

- Strumyk, Gmina Góra
- Strumyk, Gmina Kramsk
