= Drzewica coat of arms =

Polish coat of arms

Drzewica
- Earliest mention: 1248
- Families: Bagrowski, Burakowicz Popławski, Burokiewicz-Popławski, Chochlik, Czapiewski, Czapniewski, Demlicz, Demritz, Demryc, Demrycz, Dębina, Dobrowolski, Drzewicki, Drzewiecki, Duchnicki, Duchnowicz, Dziaduski, Essen, Feldman, Gibroń, Gostomski, Gran, Hrehorowicz, Hryhorowicz, Jeż, Józefowicz, Kadłubowski, Kieselewski, Kieselowski, Kisłowski, Kisselowski, Korycki, Krakówka, Kulikowski, Kuszelewski, Ławiński, Łowieński, Łowiński, Ługowski, Marcinkowski, Markowski, Mikulski, Mikułowski, Mniszkowski, Modrzewski, Mucha, Ottowicz-Życki, Pacoski, Pasz, Paszewicz, Pieślak, Pinabel, Płoszyński, Podlesiecki, Pokotiło, Pokotyłło, Popławski, Potasowicki, Protasewicz, Protasiewicz, Protasowicki, Protasowicz, Protaszewicz, Przemieniecki, Rabiec, Raczkowski, Radliński, Rośniski, Ryściński, Sierzchowski, Sinikiewicz, Siuniekiewicz, Skaczkowski, Skorka, Sławiński, Sokołowski, Stokowski, Suszkowski, Syrewicz, Szuszkowski, Szylański, Szynkiewicz, Tylański, Wasielewski, Wasilewski, Wasiłowski, Wierzchowski[3], Witaliszewski, Wojszycki, Zajączkowski, Zajkowski, Zieleniewski, Zychcki, Zychecki, Zychocki, Żabiński, Żychcki, Żychecki, Żychocki, Życki, Żyszkow, Żywicki

Drzewica is a Polish coat of arms that was used by many noble families in medieval Poland and later under the Polish–Lithuanian Commonwealth.

== Notable bearers ==
Notable bearers of this coat of arms include:

- Walerian Protasewicz

== See also ==
- Polish heraldry
- Heraldry
- Coat of arms
- List of Polish nobility coats of arms

== Bibliography ==
- Tadeusz Gajl: Herbarz polski od średniowiecza do XX wieku : ponad 4500 herbów szlacheckich 37 tysięcy nazwisk 55 tysięcy rodów. L&L, 2007. ISBN 978-83-60597-10-1.
