= Gąska coat of arms =

Polish coat of arms

Gąska
- Alternative names: Budzisz, Paparona
- Families: Budziłowicz, Budzisz, Budziszewski, Budźko, Budźco, Bujnowski, Burych, Chodowski, Choduski, Chołodowski, Dawibiński, Galin, Gorliszewski, Gąska, Hanaszewski, Jachlicki, Jaczyc, Jarogłowski, Kałuwur, Kamionomojski, Nienidzki, Niewodzki, Papara, Parpura, Parzniewski, Parzniowski, Pstrokoński, Rawil, Rzekioki, Rzekocki, Szydłowski, Wadoracki, Wodziniecki, Wojudcki, Wuydzyn

Gąska is a Polish coat of arms. It was used by several szlachta families in the times of the Polish–Lithuanian Commonwealth.

== Notable bearers ==
Notable bearers of this coat of arms include:

== See also ==
- Budźco
- Polish heraldry
- Heraldry
- Coat of arms
- List of Polish nobility coats of arms

== Sources ==
- Dynastic Genealogy
- Ornatowski.com
