= Skartabellat =

Skartabellat (Latin: scartabellatus) was a historical legal institution of incomplete or probationary nobility in Poland.

== History ==
In medieval Poland, members of this lower tier of the szlachta (nobility) were known as świerczałki. Over time, some of these families achieved parity (paritas) with the full nobility, while others lost their status and descended into the sołtys (village head or bailiff) class.

The institution re-emerged in the mid-17th century. It appeared in a 1654 parliamentary resolution regarding the ennoblement (nobilitacja) of Mikołaj Hadziewicz, which concluded with the phrase salvis legibus de scartabellis sancitis ("saving the enacted laws on the skartabellat"). The concept was defined more concretely in the pacta conventa of 1669. Under these legal restrictions, newly ennobled individuals and their descendants were barred from holding public office or serving as Sejm deputies (posłowie) until the third generation.

== Etymology ==
In the 16th century, Sebastian Petrycy derived the term skartabellus (meaning a newly created noble) from the Latin phrase ex charta bellicus, interpreting it as "one who fights by virtue of a charter granted for nobility", or literally "fighting from a paper".

In contrast, Joachim Lelewel linked the word to the Italian verb scartabellare ("to leaf through papers"). This latter derivation aligns closely with the German historical concepts used for equivalent social groups, such as Briefadel ("patent nobility") or Papieradel ("paper nobility", literally "nobility on paper").

== Social composition and abolition ==
The ranks of the skartabelli were primarily filled by members of the burgher class (mieszczaństwo). Acts of ennoblement occasionally contained provisions granting a partial or total exemption from the probationary status (referred to as praeciso scartabellatu), which was especially common for individuals rewarded for outstanding military merit.

All remaining legal mentions and regulations regarding the skartabellat were definitively abolished in Polish law by a decree (ukase) issued in 1817. From that point onward, newly ennobled individuals enjoyed full noble rights immediately upon matriculation in their respective land or province.

== See also ==
- Heraldic adoption
- Ennoblement
- Indigenat
- Nagana szlachectwa
- Włodycy

== Bibliography ==
- Oswald Balzer, Skartabelat w ustroju szlachetstwa polskiego [The Skartabellat in the Structure of the Polish Nobility], Kraków, 1911.
