= Poronia coat of arms =

Polish coat of arms

Poronia
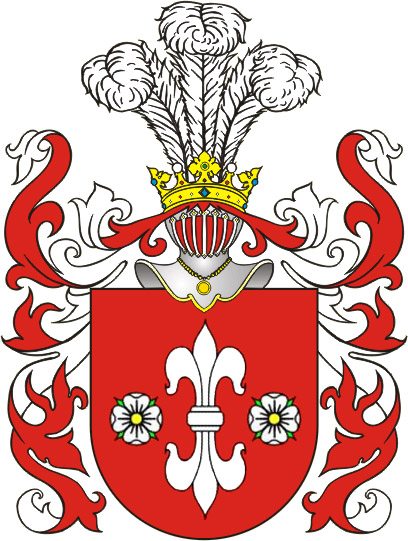
- Earliest mention: unknown
- Towns: none

Poronia is a Polish coat of arms. It was used by several szlachta families in the times of the Polish–Lithuanian Commonwealth.

== Notable bearers ==
Notable bearers of this coat of arms include:

== See also ==
- Polish heraldry
- Heraldry
- Coat of arms
