= Ślubów =

Ślubów may refer to the following places in Poland:

- Ślubów, Lower Silesian Voivodeship (south-west Poland)
- Ślubów, Masovian Voivodeship (east-central Poland)
