= Gmina Góra =

Gmina Góra Góra Commune
- Gmina
- Flag Coat of arms

- Location within Lower Silesian Voivodeship
- Coordinates (Góra): 51°40′N 16°33′E
- Country: Poland
- Voivodeship: Lower Silesian
- County: Góra
- Seat: Góra
- Sołectwos: Borszyn Mały, Borszyn Wielki, Bronów, Brzeżany, Chróścina, Czernina, Czernina Dolna, Czernina Górna, Glinka, Gola Górowska, Grabowno, Jastrzębia, Kłoda Górowska, Kruszyniec, Łagiszyn, Ligota, Nowa Wioska, Osetno, Osetno Małe, Polanowo, Radosław, Rogów Górowski, Ryczeń, Sławęcice, Ślubów, Stara Góra, Strumienna, Strumyk, Sułków, Szedziec, Wierzowice Małe, Wierzowice Wielkie, Witoszyce, Włodków Dolny, Zawieścice

Area
  - Total: 268.74 km^{2} (103.76 sq mi)

Population (2019-06-30)
  - Total: 19,956
  - Density: 74.258/km^{2} (192.33/sq mi)
- Website: http://www.gora.com.pl

Gmina Góra is an urban-rural gmina (administrative district) in Góra County, Lower Silesian Voivodeship, in south-western Poland. Its seat is the town of Góra, which lies approximately 69 kilometres (43 mi) north-west of the regional capital Wrocław.

The gmina covers an area of 268.74 square kilometres (103.76 sq mi), and as of 2019 its total population was 19,956.

== Neighbouring gminas ==
Gmina Góra is bordered by the gminas of Bojanowo, Jemielno, Niechlów, Rydzyna, Święciechowa and Wąsosz.

== Villages ==
Apart from the town of Góra, the gmina contains the villages of Borszyn Mały, Borszyn Wielki, Bronów, Brzeżany, Chróścina, Czernina, Czernina Dolna, Czernina Górna, Glinka, Gola Górowska, Grabowno, Jastrzębia, Kłoda Górowska, Kruszyniec, Łagiszyn, Ligota, Nowa Wioska, Osetno, Osetno Małe, Polanowo, Radosław, Rogów Górowski, Ryczeń, Sławęcice, Ślubów, Stara Góra, Strumienna, Strumyk, Sułków, Szedziec, Wierzowice Małe, Wierzowice Wielkie, Witoszyce, Włodków Dolny and Zawieścice.

== Twin towns – sister cities ==
Gmina Góra is twinned with:

- Herzberg am Harz, Germany
