= Włodyka =

Type of knight in Poland

A włodyka was a minor knight (rycerz) in medieval Poland. In the 15th century, the majority of its members integrated into the ranks of the petty nobility (szlachta).

The exact nature and origin of the włodycy remain a subject of scholarly debate. Originally, the term was likely used in Poland to designate all knights, including both high dignitaries and lower-ranking combatants. During the formation of the cohesive noble estate (from the mid-13th century onwards), economically weaker elements of the knightly class possibly including the so-called "service knighthood" (rycerstwo służebne) formed a distinct social stratum situated below the feudal lords and higher knighthood. This group was highly visible in regions such as Lesser Poland (Małopolska) and Mazovia (Mazowsze). Sczaniecki describes the włodycy as the Polish equivalent of ministeriales the lower nobility in the Holy Roman Empire who originated from unfree populations tied to the land and obligated to military service.

Under medieval Polish law, the weregild (główszczyzna) paid for killing a włodyka was half that of a full knight, but twice as high as that of a warrior "created from a scultetus (sołtys) or a kmieć (wealthy farmer)" (Latin: militi autem creato de sculteto vel de kmethone), who was known as a panosza. The statutory damages for personal injury (nawiązka) were similarly lower than a knight's but higher than a panosza's. With the development of overarching noble estate privileges in the 15th century, the włodycy gradually disappeared as a separate class; some successfully joined the petty nobility, while others merged into the burgher (mieszczaństwo) or peasantry (chłopi) classes.

== See also ==
- Ministeriales
- Skartabellat
- Szlachta
