= Sławęcice, Lower Silesian Voivodeship =

Sławęcice
- Village
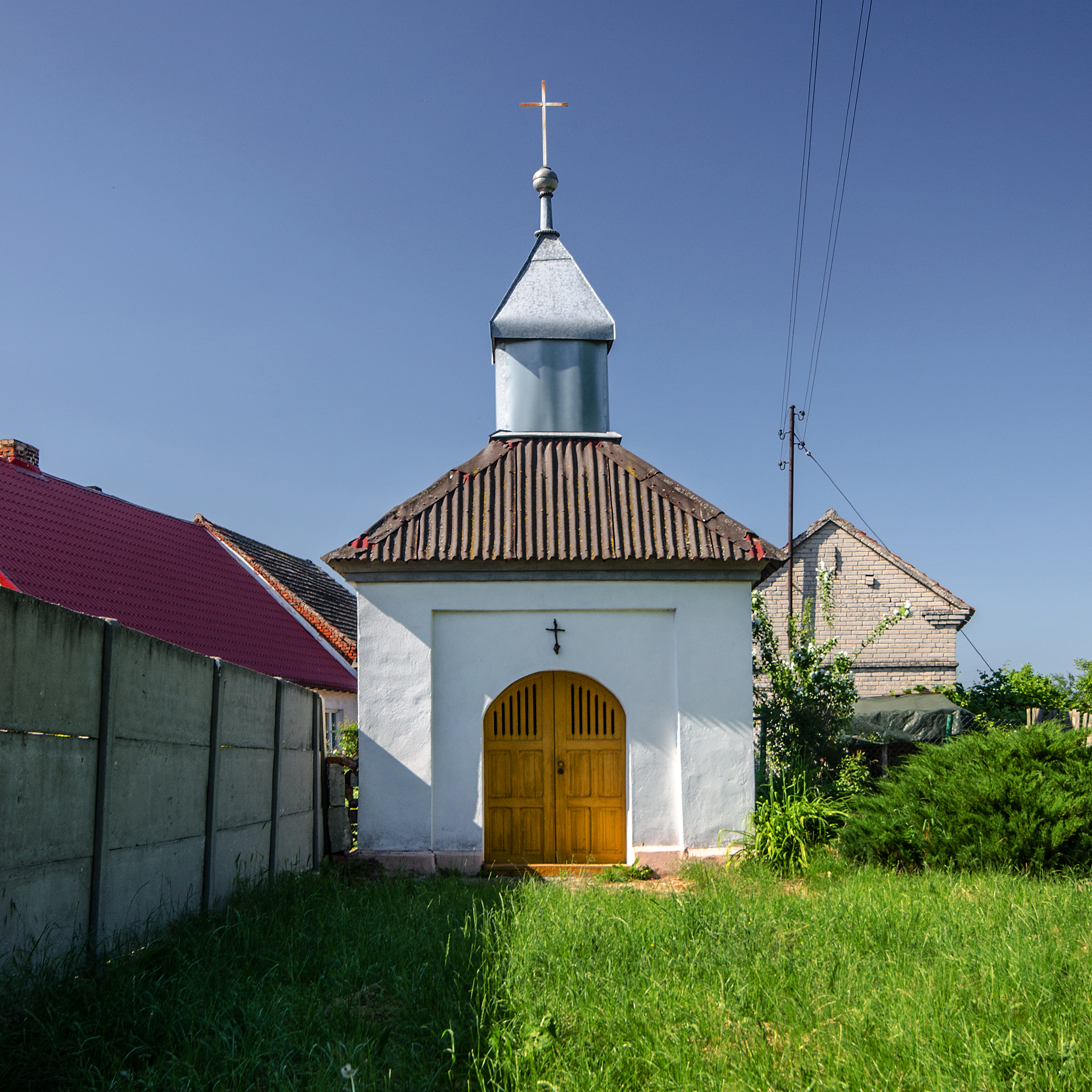
- Chapel in Sławęcice

- Location within Poland
- Coordinates: 51°42′N 16°31′E
- Country: Poland
- Voivodeship: Lower Silesian
- County: Góra
- Gmina: Góra
- Time zone: UTC+1 (CET)
  - Summer (DST): UTC+2 (CEST)
- Vehicle registration: DGR

Sławęcice [swavɛnˈt͡ɕit͡sɛ] is a village in the administrative district of Gmina Góra, within Góra County, Lower Silesian Voivodeship, in western Poland.
