= Wierzowice Małe =

- Village
- Location within Poland
- Coordinates: 51°35′49″N 16°33′59″E
- Country: Poland
- Voivodeship: Lower Silesian
- Powiat: Góra
- Gmina: Góra
- Time zone: UTC+1 (CET)
  - Summer (DST): UTC+2 (CEST)
- Vehicle registration: DGR

Wierzowice Małe (Polish pronunciation: [vjɛʐɔˈvit͡sɛ ˈmawɛ]) is a village in the administrative district of Gmina Góra, within Góra County, Lower Silesian Voivodeship, in western Poland. According to population statistics based on Poland’s official data, the village had 38 residents in the 2021 census. According to population statistics based on Poland’s official data, the village had 38 residents in the 2021 census.
