= Włodków Dolny =

- Village
- Location within Poland
- Coordinates: 51°41′08″N 16°33′31″E
- Country: Poland
- Voivodeship: Lower Silesian
- Powiat: Góra
- Gmina: Góra
- Time zone: UTC+1 (CET)
  - Summer (DST): UTC+2 (CEST)
- Vehicle registration: DGR

Włodków Dolny [ˈvwɔtkuf ˈdɔlnɨ] is a village in the administrative district of Gmina Góra, within Góra County, Lower Silesian Voivodeship, in western Poland.
