= Kruszyniec, Lower Silesian Voivodeship =

Kruszyniec
- Village
- Location within Poland
- Coordinates: 51°39′01″N 16°34′52″E
- Country: Poland
- Voivodeship: Lower Silesian
- County: Góra
- Gmina: Góra
- Time zone: UTC+1 (CET)
  - Summer (DST): UTC+2 (CEST)
- Vehicle registration: DGR

Kruszyniec [kruˈʂɨɲɛt͡s] is a village in the administrative district of Gmina Góra, within Góra County, Lower Silesian Voivodeship, in western Poland.

In the village, there is the Wecke memorial, in remembrance of the forest warden Wecke who was murdered by a poacher on 21 December 1924.
