= Osetno, Lower Silesian Voivodeship =

Osetno
- Village
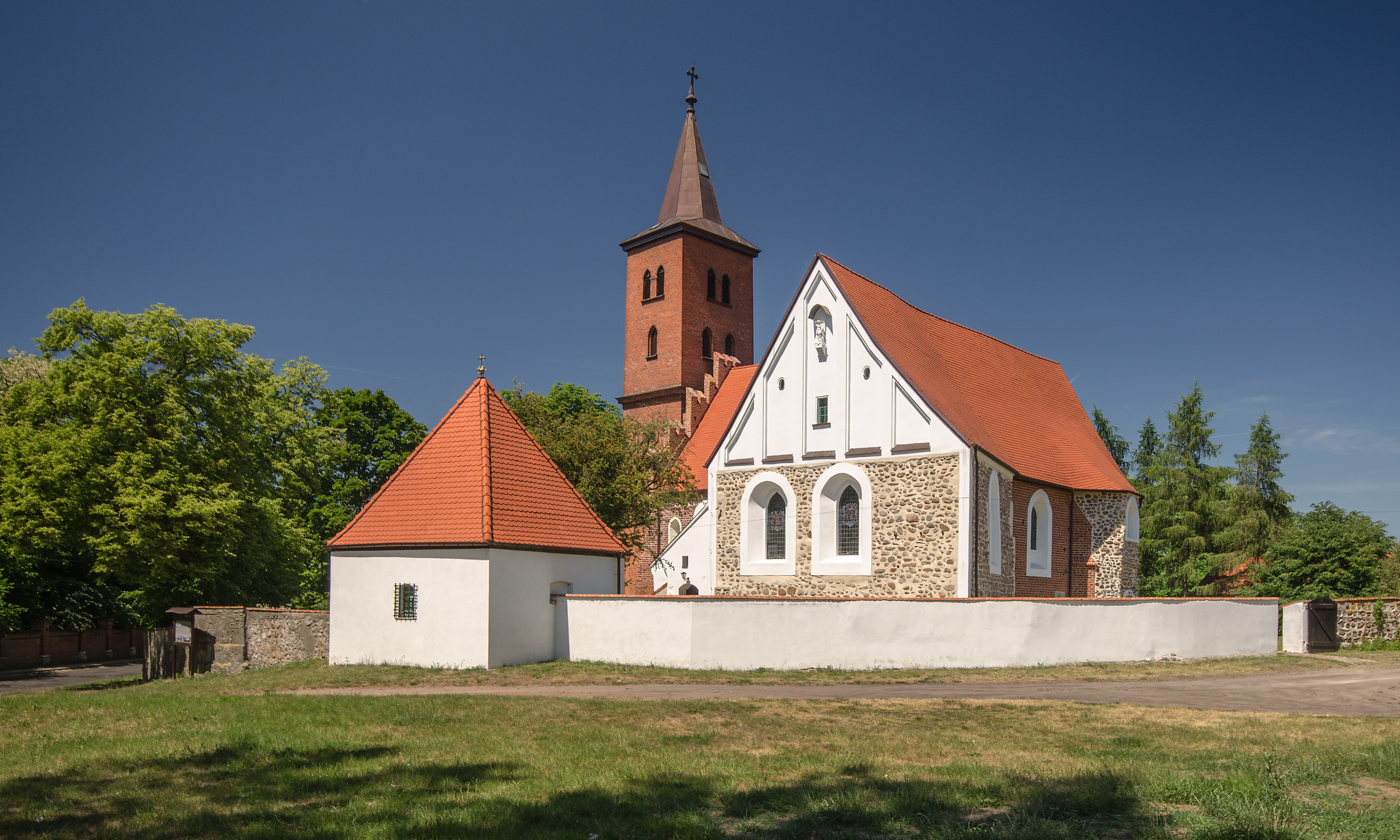

- Location within Poland
- Coordinates: 51°38′8″N 16°27′37″E
- Country: Poland
- Voivodeship: Lower Silesian
- Powiat: Góra
- Gmina: Góra

Population
  - Total: 330
- (approximate)
- Time zone: UTC+1 (CET)
  - Summer (DST): UTC+2 (CEST)
- Vehicle registration: DGR

Osetno [ɔˈsɛtnɔ] is a village in the administrative district of Gmina Góra, within Góra County, Lower Silesian Voivodeship, in western Poland.

The village has an approximate population of 330.
