= Borszyn Wielki =

- Village
- Location within Poland
- Coordinates: 51°40′N 16°38′E
- Country: Poland
- Voivodeship: Lower Silesian
- Powiat: Góra
- Gmina: Góra
- Time zone: UTC+1 (CET)
  - Summer (DST): UTC+2 (CEST)
- Vehicle registration: DGR

Borszyn Wielki (Polish pronunciation: [ˈbɔrʂɨn ˈvjɛlkʲi]) is a village in the administrative district of Gmina Góra, within Góra County, Lower Silesian Voivodeship, in western Poland.
