= Zawieścice =

- Village
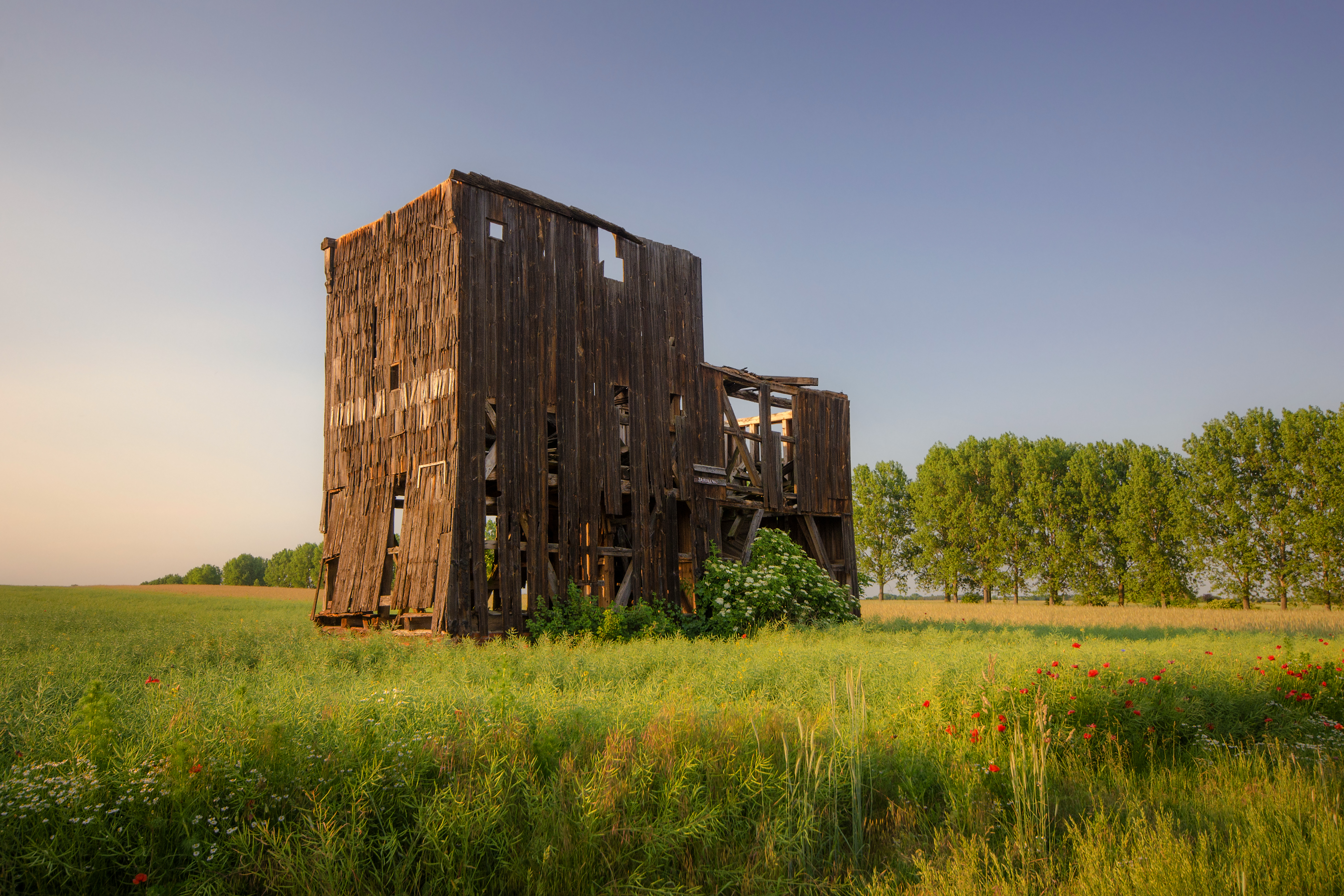
- Old windmill in Zawieścice

- Location within Poland
- Coordinates: 51°38′27″N 16°34′38″E
- Country: Poland
- Voivodeship: Lower Silesian
- Powiat: Góra
- Gmina: Góra
- Time zone: UTC+1 (CET)
  - Summer (DST): UTC+2 (CEST)
- Vehicle registration: DGR

Zawieścice [zavjɛɕˈt͡ɕit͡sɛ] is a village in the administrative district of Gmina Góra, within Góra County, Lower Silesian Voivodeship, in western Poland.
