= Jastrzębia, Lower Silesian Voivodeship =

Jastrzębia
- Village
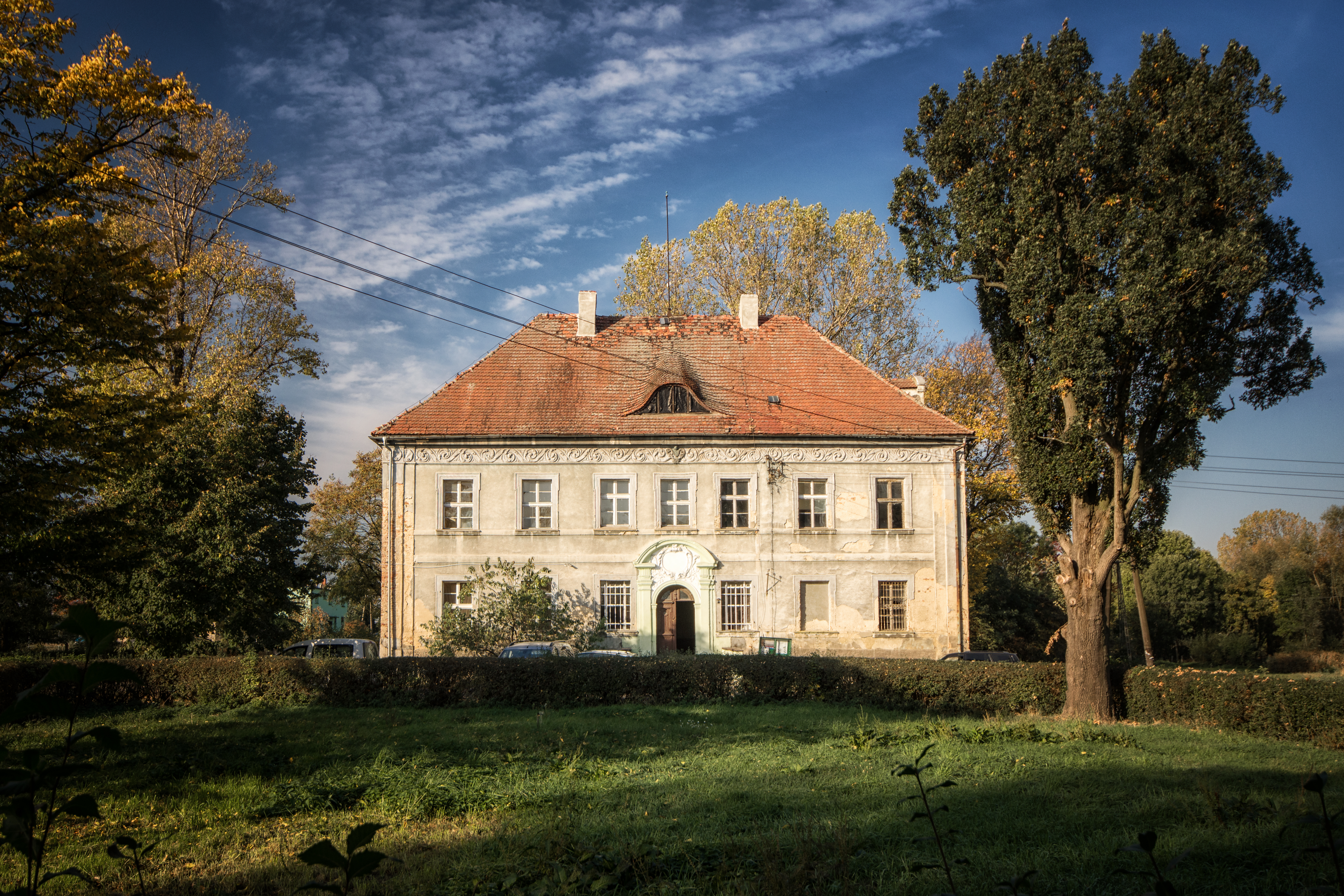
- Old manor house in Jastrzębia

- Location within Poland
- Coordinates: 51°40′28″N 16°29′01″E
- Country: Poland
- Voivodeship: Lower Silesian
- County: Góra
- Gmina: Góra
- Time zone: UTC+1 (CET)
  - Summer (DST): UTC+2 (CEST)
- Vehicle registration: DGR

Jastrzębia [jasˈtʂɛmbja] is a village in the administrative district of Gmina Góra, within Góra County, Lower Silesian Voivodeship, in south-western Poland.

The name of the village is of Polish origin and comes from the word jastrząb, which means "hawk".
