= Heraldic adoption =

Varieties of the Nałęcz coat of arms associated with heraldic adoptions

Heraldic adoption (Polish: adopcja herbowa) was in the Kingdom of Poland a legal form of ennoblement and adoption into an existing heraldic clan along with assuming the coat of arms of that clan. It took place as a result of an act issued by the King. The adoption of heraldic arms was a procedure used solely in Polish heraldry and was one of the earlier "old way" forms of ennoblement in Poland. It became particularly popular in the 15th century, especially with prosperous or prestigious city burghers and patricians aspiring to attain noble status, but was abolished by the first half of the 17th century.

== History ==
Nobles were either born into a noble family, adopted by a noble family, or achieved noble rank through ennoblement (nobilitacja) by Poland's king. Ennoblement, i.e. the transition to the nobility of a person, who had not been knighted yet, existed in Poland as early as the 14th century. In Poland, ennoblement of individuals was originally not entirely exclusive to the monarch, but could also be conferred to an individual upon being adopted under the heraldic coat of arms of Poland's influential knightly families and magnates and acknowledged by the King or Polish Crown.

A well-known act of heraldic adoption was the admission into Poland's nobility of Catholic boyar nobles from Grand Duchy of Lithuania during the Polish-Lithuanian union in connection with the Union of Horodło in 1413. Whereby, forty-seven Lithuanian/Ruthenian nobles from GDL were adopted into Poland's nobility and granted Polish coats of arms.

=== Early modern period ===
Heraldic adoptions were part of a broad plan devised by the Polish nobility to pander to the aspirations of ambitious city burghers and patricians, thus securing political allies for themselves. Heraldic adoptions became particularly popular in the 15th century and the Polish nobility willingly adopted new members into their heraldic clans as they knew this would not entail any claims on their estates, for instance, from inheritance rights. Ennoblement involved specific diplomatic procedures and required aspiring city burghers and patricians to make various financial contributions on behalf of Poland's monarchy and nobility, for example through taxes, loans, endowments or gifts.

Over time, Poland's nobles became increasingly reluctant to over-expand the nobility (or rather saw need to prevent it), since heraldic adoption was open to the possibility of abuse, adoption for a fee, buying nobility (especially by wealthy city burghers) and uncontrolled expansion of the nobility. This caused the disappearance of ennoblement by heraldic adoption by the end of the 16th century, and also limited ennoblement in favour of the King by requiring parliamentary consent from Poland's general sejm.

By 1578, royal prerogative was widely vested in Poland's general sejm and each ennoblement required parliamentary consent. From 1601, only Poland's parliament—the general sejm, was privileged by an act of law to approve and confer ennoblement. By 1633, heraldic adoption was abolished.

From 1669, the ennobled who came mainly by then from the burgher class would only receive skartabellat (similar to the German Briefadel, or Letters patent), a specific form of institution and ennoblement introduced by pacta conventa, a lower class of nobility where newly created nobles could only hold public offices and perform legations not until after the third generation; from 1775 an obligation was imposed on newly created nobles possessing (purchasing) land estate.

During the reign of Stanisław August Poniatowski (r. 1764 to 1795), almost half of the total number of Polish ennoblements was made. Under the reigns of Stanisław Leszczyński and Stanisław August Poniatowski, both were also known for circumventing the restrictions placed on conferring ennoblement, applying the so-called 'secret ennoblements', without parliamentary confirmation. Such ennoblement in fact did not give any prerogatives to Polish nobility and was mainly applied to foreigners. Without the consent of the general sejm, some Polish kings also granted personal nobility, without the right of inheritance, giving the title of Knight of the Golden Spur. Ennoblements, including secret ones, were often a way to fund the royal treasury or to reconcile supporters. Therefore, among others the right to ennoblement has also been usurped, for example, by the bishops of Kraków as the Dukes of Siewierz.

== Bibliography ==
- Możejko, Beata (2017). New Studies in Medieval and Renaissance Poland and Prussia: The Impact of Gdańsk. London and New York: Routledge. ISBN 9781138696488.
- Michta, Jerzy (1992). Nobilitacja i indygenat w szlacheckiej Rzeczypospolitej [Ennoblement and indigenate in the nobility of the Polish Republic] (in Polish). Lublin: Nakładem Uniwersytetu Marii Curie-Skłodowskiej.

== See also ==
- Ennoblement in the Kingdom of Poland
