= Glinka, Lower Silesian Voivodeship =

Glinka
- Village
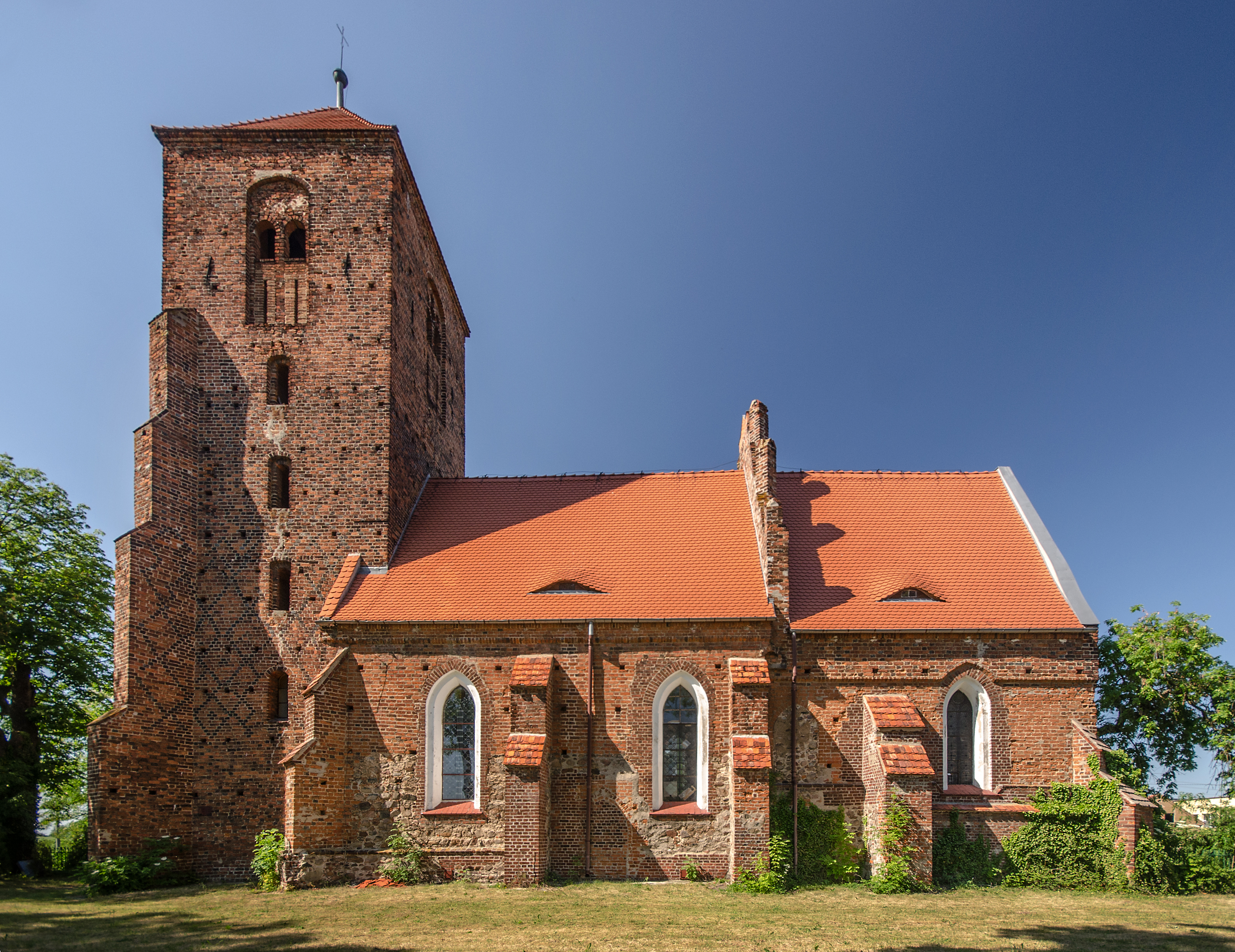
- Saint Martin church in Glinka

- Location within Poland
- Coordinates: 51°42′30″N 16°31′20″E
- Country: Poland
- Voivodeship: Lower Silesian
- Powiat: Góra
- Gmina: Góra
- Time zone: UTC+1 (CET)
  - Summer (DST): UTC+2 (CEST)
- Vehicle registration: DGR

Glinka [ˈɡlinka] is a village in the administrative district of Gmina Góra, within Góra County, Lower Silesian Voivodeship, in western Poland.
