= Radosław, Lower Silesian Voivodeship =

Radosław
- Village
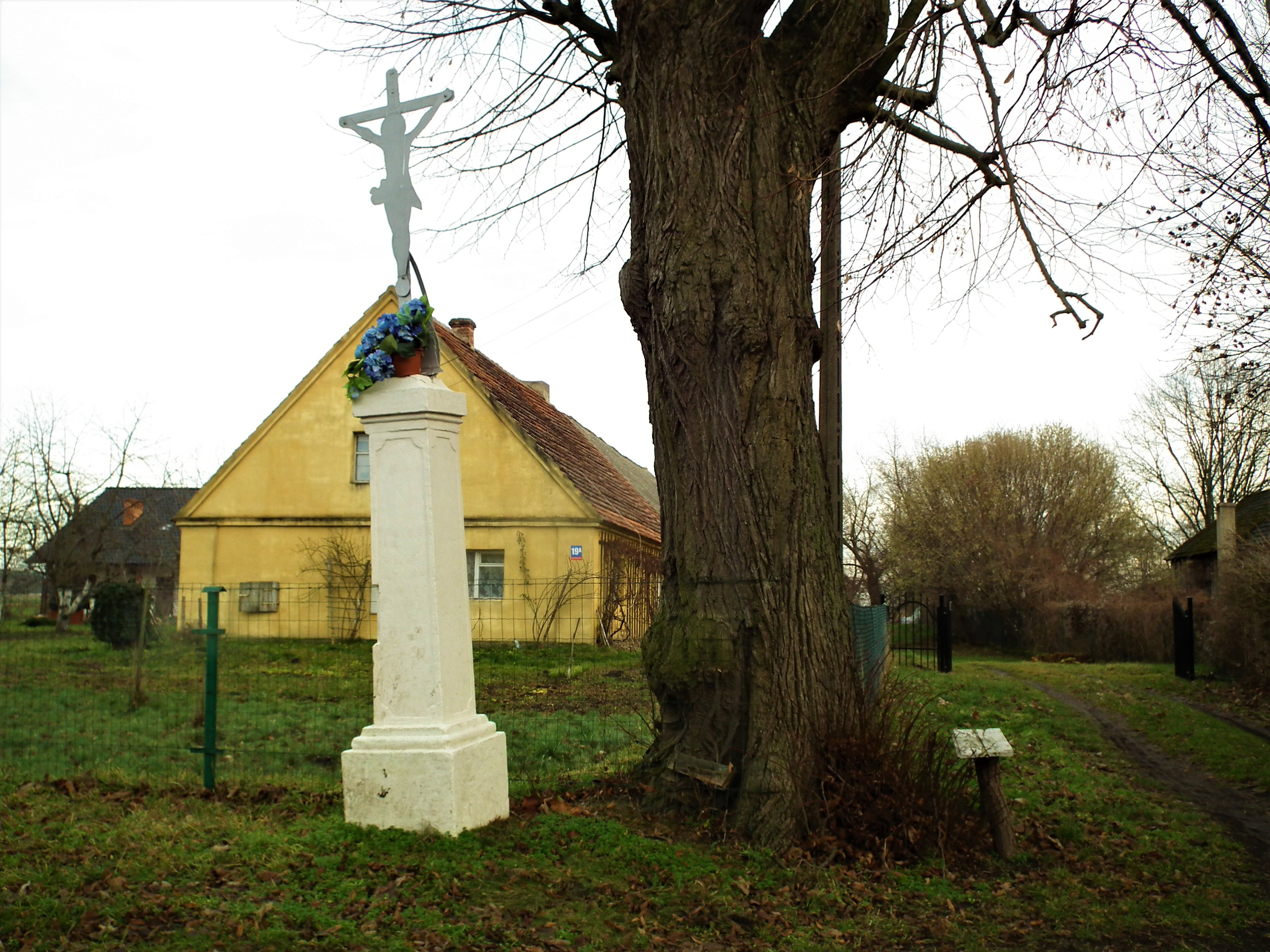
- Wayside shrine in Radosław

- Location within Poland
- Coordinates: 51°45′34″N 16°28′56″E
- Country: Poland
- Voivodeship: Lower Silesian
- Powiat: Góra
- Gmina: Góra
- Time zone: UTC+1 (CET)
  - Summer (DST): UTC+2 (CEST)
- Vehicle registration: DGR

Radosław [raˈdɔswaf] is a village in the administrative district of Gmina Góra, within Góra County, Lower Silesian Voivodeship, in western Poland.
