= Czernina, Lower Silesian Voivodeship =

Czernina
- Village
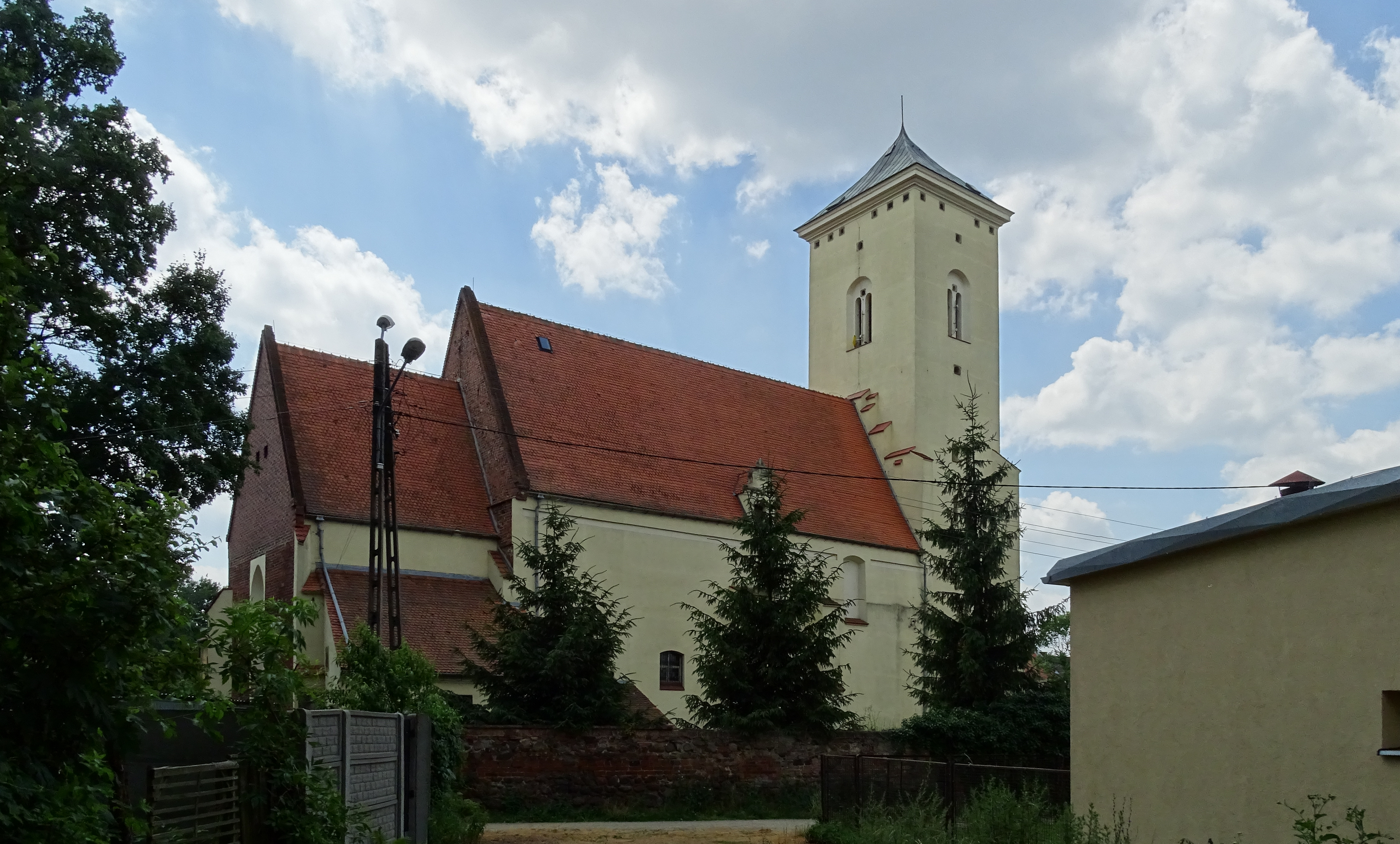
- Saint Lawrence Church from the 15th century

- Location within Poland
- Coordinates: 51°43′15″N 16°36′57″E
- Country: Poland
- Voivodeship: Lower Silesian
- County: Góra
- Gmina: Góra
- First mentioned: 1284
- Population: 940
- Time zone: UTC+1 (CET)
  - Summer (DST): UTC+2 (CEST)
- Vehicle registration: DGR

Czernina [t͡ʂɛrˈnina] is a village (former town) in the administrative district of Gmina Góra, within Góra County, Lower Silesian Voivodeship, in western Poland.

== History ==
The oldest known mention of the village comes from 1284, when it was part of fragmented Piast-ruled Poland. In the Liber fundationis episcopatus Vratislaviensis from ca. 1305 it was mentioned under its Old Polish name Czirnina. Its name is of Polish origin. In the 14th century Czernina became a private village owned by Polish nobleman Jan of Wierzbna coat of arms, who also founded the nearby town of Rydzyna.

Later on, the village was also part of Bohemia (Czechia), Prussia and Germany. In 1937, during a massive Nazi campaign of renaming of placenames, the village was renamed to Lesten to erase traces of Polish origin. After the defeat of Germany in World War II, in 1945, the village became again part of Poland and its historic name was restored.

== Transport ==
The Polish S5 highway runs nearby, east of the village.

== Notable people ==
- Robert Fiedler (1810–1877), Polish pastor and religious writer, opponent of Germanisation
