= Dérogeance =

Dérogeance ("derogation (of nobility)") was grievance for persons who did acts deemed unworthy of the noble status. A consequence of dérogeance was loss of the privileges of nobility (but not full revocation of nobility). In particular the person was no longer free of taxation.

Dérogeance included engagement in certain professions and occupations considered to be "lowly". In particular, it prevented the nobility from engaging in commerce and retail trade. Many ancient cultures restricted their noble classes from commercial activity, although this was less true of the Roman Empire.

As the economies of Europe evolved in the latter 17th century and the 18th century, the strictures of dérogeance increasingly came under criticism as being not only an obstacle to the prosperity of the nobility but contrary to the overall interests of the state. In particular, the 1756 book La noblesse commerçante by the Abbé Gabriel François Coyer, first published anonymously in London and then translated into German by Johann Heinrich Gottlob Justi, proved influential. Spain abolished restrictions on the commercial activities of noblemen in 1770 and other western European countries took similar steps.

== See also ==
- Vituperatio nobilitatis
