= Revocation of nobility =

Removal of noble status

Revocation of nobility is the removal of the noble status of a person.

That should be distinguished from the concept of dérogeance ("derogation" of nobility), which, for example, in the context of French history, led to removal of the privileges of nobility but not necessarily the right for nobility itself. In particular, the nobility of descendants was not automatically lost.

Nobility could be restored by the King's letter of rehabilitation (Lettre de réhabilitation).

Since nobility was exempted from taxes, especially the taille, many usurped the appearances of nobility, which could continue across generations. Therefore, in France there was a special establishment "Grand Inquiry into Nobility" Grande enquête sur la noblesse, which was in force from 1666 to 1727. That was accompanied by various edicts which declared certain elements of the outfit (heraldry, armaments, decorations, etc.) to be permitted only for nobility. Revocation of usurped nobility was accompanied with heavy fines.

In addition to real usurpation, inquiries were made into hereditary nobility. Unless the nobility was given by a Letter of Ennoblement, according to Grande enquête one had to prove that at least four generations of his ancestors enjoyed the noble status.

In Poland, the practice of nagana szlachectwa was questioning the nobility by any accuser.
