= Heraldic clan =

Noble bearers of the same coat of arms in Poland

Arms of the Ślepowron heraldic clan, shared by at least 992 Polish noble families.

A heraldic clan (Polish: ród herbowy), in Poland, comprised all the noble (szlachta) bearers of the same coat of arms. The members of a heraldic clan were not necessarily linked by consanguinity. The concept was unique to Polish heraldry.

== History ==
The Polish word herb derives from the German Erbe, "inheritance" or "heritage", and denotes a coat of arms. Unrelated families could be granted the same coat of arms and thus become co-armigers sharing the same herb. Bearers of the same coat of arms were variously called herbowni, współherbowni (co-armorials), or klejnotni, from klejnot, crest. The numbers of such individual families often reached several dozen; several hundred were not uncommon.

The heraldic-family tradition constitutes one of the hypotheses about the origins of the Polish nobility: the unique feature of Polish heraldry being the practice of inducting unrelated families into the same coat of arms, sometimes with minor variations of tincture. In time, all those families were integrated into the Polish nobility, the szlachta. The number of families within a particular "heraldic family" varied over time and could be increased as a result of heraldic adoption. Entire noble classes from other nations, for example from Lithuania, were incorporated by adoption—granted an indygenat—into the Polish nobility and its heraldic system. Removal from the heraldic system was also possible, by vituperatio nobilitatis, a legal procedure for revocation of nobility.

Polish coats of arms have their individual names, usually stemming from the heraldic clan's ancient seat or battle cry; or from the way the arms were depicted "canting arms". The battle-cry derivation of many Polish heraldic family names has given rise to the now outdated term "proclamatio arms", referring to the names' hortatory nature.

From the 17th to the 20th centuries, belonging to a distinguished house and a shared armorial lineage mattered to members of the szlachta. That is why most modern Polish armorials are arranged by clan names, rather than by their respective family arms, as was the case with 16th-century armorials.

== See also ==
- Sarmatism
- List of szlachta
- List of Polish titled nobility
- Polish name
- Polish heraldry
- Sippe
- Norse clans
- Scottish clans
