= Polish heraldry =

Study of coats of arms in lands of historical Poland

Coat of arms of Poland.

Polish heraldry is the study of the coats of arms that have historically been used in Poland and the Polish–Lithuanian Commonwealth. It treats of specifically Polish heraldic traits and of the Polish heraldic system, contrasted with heraldic systems used elsewhere, notably in Western Europe. Due to the distinctive ways in which feudal societies evolved, Poland's heraldic traditions differ substantially from those of the modern-day German lands and France.

Polish heraldry is an integral part of the history of the Polish szlachta (nobility).

== History ==
Unlike Western Europe, in Poland, the Polish nobles szlachta did not emerge exclusively from the feudal class of knights but stemmed in great part from earlier Slavic local rulers and free warriors and mercenaries. Rulers often hired these free warriors and mercenaries to form military units (Polish: Drużyna) and eventually, in the 11th century during the time of Casimir I the Restorer with the development of feudalism, armies paid by the Prince were replaced by knights that were paid in land. Much written evidence from the Middle Ages demonstrates how some elements of the Polish nobility did emerge from former Slavic rulers that were included in the ranks of the knightly class under the terms of the chivalric law (ius militare) and iure polonico.

Because Polish clans (Polish: Rody) have different origins, only part of the szlachta can be traced all the way back to the traditional old clan system based on kinship. The clans that could show kinship belonged to a House (Polish: Dom), such as the House of Odrowąż. Later, when different Houses created different surnames for each property, the House turned into the Clan Odrowąż. Other szlachta were not related and their unions were mostly voluntary and based on fellowship and brotherhood rather than kinship, still being full members of the Clan, creating Clan politics like in Clan Ostoja or Clan Abdank, but forming a heraldic clan. Near the end of the history of the Polish–Lithuanian Commonwealth, due to adoptions and other circumstances, all Clans in Poland turned into Heraldic Clans.

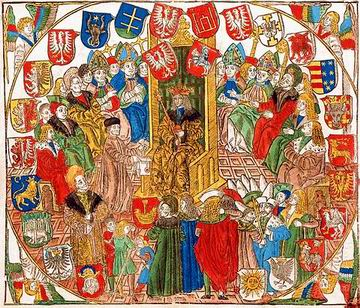
A leaf from the "Łaski's Statute" depicting the Polish Senate

Coat of arms of Stibor of Stiboricz

In the year 1244, Bolesław, Duke of Masovia, identified members of the knights' clan as members of a genealogia:

I received my good servitors [Raciborz and Albert] from the land of [Great] Poland, and from the clan [genealogia] called Jelito, with my well-disposed knowledge [i.e., consent and encouragement] and the cry [vocitatio], [that is], the godło, [by the name of] Nagody, and I established them in the said land of mine, Masovia, [on the military tenure described elsewhere in the charter].

The documentation regarding Raciborz and Albert's tenure is the earliest surviving of the use of the clan name and cry defining the honorable status of Polish knights. The names of knightly genealogiae only came to be associated with heraldic devices later in the Middle Ages and in the early modern period. The Polish clan name and cry ritualized the ius militare, i.e., the power to command an army; and they had been used sometime before 1244 to define knightly status.

According to Polish historian Tadeusz Manteuffel, a Polish clan (ród) consisted of people related by blood and descending from a common ancestor, giving the ród/clan a highly developed sense of solidarity (see gens). The starosta (or starszyna) had judicial and military power over the ród/clan, although this power was often exercised with an assembly of elders. Strongholds called gród were built where a unifying religious cult was powerful, where trials were conducted, and where clans gathered in the face of danger. The opole was the territory occupied by a single tribe. Such clans often used signs (proto-coat of arms) that later, during 13th century become coat of arms of the House or the Clan. The origin of those proto-CoAs is controversial. Some, like Sulimirski, claim Sarmatian origin and some like historian Franciszek Piekosiński claim that those signs are Runes of dynastic tribal rulers.

Heraldic symbols began to be used in Poland in the 13th century. The generic Polish term for a coat of arms, herb, was used for the first time in the year 1415 at the Royal Office with text et quatuor herbis, originating as a borrowing of the Czech erb, which in turn came from the German Erbe – heritage.

Many Polish coats of arms and the overwhelming majority of their variations possess charges derived from Polish linear property marks, which appeared before the emergence of any heraldic concept. These signs were very similar to tamgas which were used in territories stretching from Siberia to the Caucasus region and the Crimean Peninsula, including by the Sarmatians in antiquity and by the Tatars in the Middle Ages. At the same time, they were hereditary signs serving as identification and ownership marks. As early as the 13th and 14th centuries they became objectified, while their shape underwent a process of heraldization. This gave rise to heraldic signs including stars, horseshoes, crescents, and the rogacina (arrowhead, along with its variations), which are symbols characteristic of Polish heraldry.

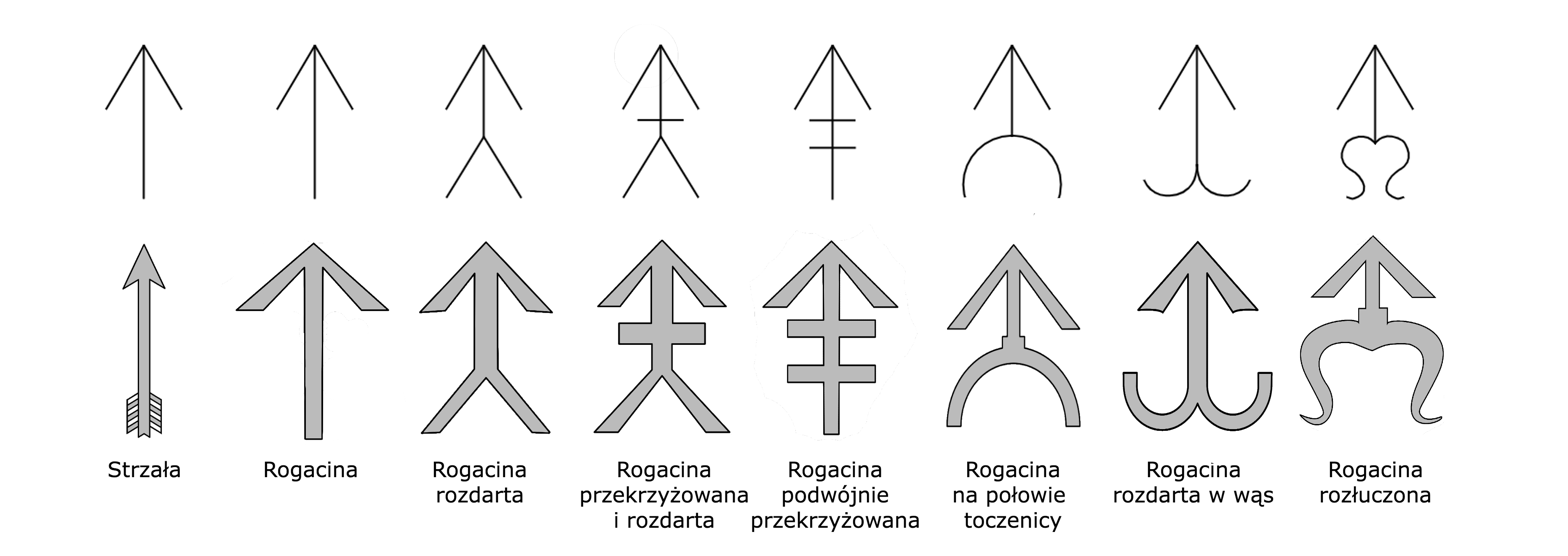

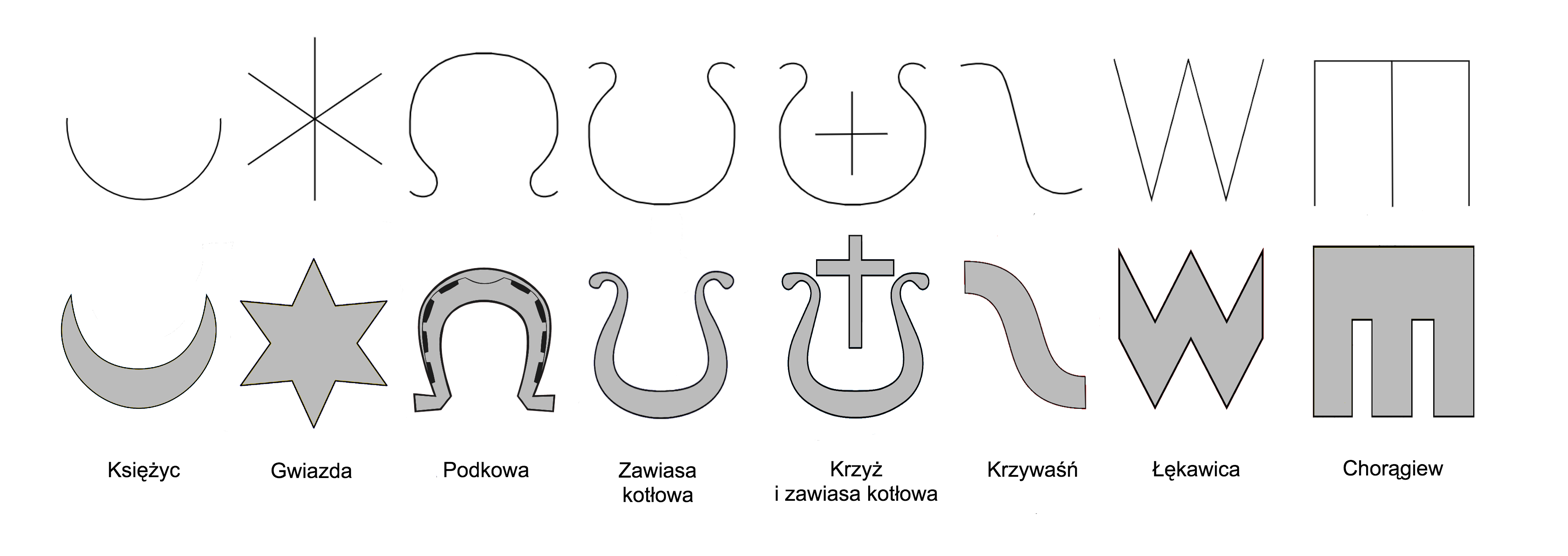

During the Union of Horodło (1413), 47 Prince and Boyar families of the Grand Duchy of Lithuania were adopted into 47 Polish noble clans and began to use Polish coats of arms.

== Medieval coats of arms ==
Ślepowron variations

Since there was no heraldic authority in Poland or in the Polish–Lithuanian Commonwealth, many old Polish coats of arms were changed over time by different publications, losing their original appearance. The Heraldic Commission was registered on 20 January 2010. Although many medieval Polish coats of arms were presented in Western European rolls of arms, there were no publications that presented original coats of arms in Poland until the 20th century, when Adam Heymowski began recovering old Polish coats of arms. His work was continued by Professor Józef Szymański, who finally published an armorial of original Polish coats of arms.

The ancient Pałuki family coat of arms was visually close to the Topór coat of arms, and in time a similar coat was assumed by Clan Topór. As the Ostoja coat of arms evolved, the dragon was replaced by feathers and the cross by the sword, followed by other changes between ancient and modern versions.

Many Polish coats of arms feature so-called variations, which are particular to Polish heraldry. In many cases, variations are simple errors, sometimes the family wished to make a distinction within the clan and in other cases coats have been called variations of a particular family's coat just because they look similar, which all together create a unique heraldic clan organisation in Poland.

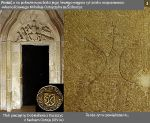
Proto-coat of arms of Ostoja

Starting with proto-arms and families like Odrowąż being the House of Odrowąż, Polish family names were appended in many cases with -cki or -ski in reference to the name of their properties; for example, if a person named Chełmski acquired the town of Poniec, he would change his surname to Poniecki. Furthermore, a Jerzykowski (de Jerzykowo) that owned the property of Baranowo changed his surname to Baranowski (de Baranowo) and a Baranowski that owned the property of Chrzastowo change the surname to Chrzastowski (de Chrzastowo).

A family became a clan or "heraldic family" using the same coat of arms. Later, when clans adopted several families, they formed heraldic clans, families using the same arms, in many cases defending clan politics but not necessarily blood related to each other.

== Peculiarities ==
Ostrogski coat of arms

Although the Polish heraldic system evolved under the influence of German heraldry, there are many notable differences.

The most striking peculiarity of the system is that a coat of arms does not belong to a single family. A number of unrelated families (sometimes hundreds of them), usually with a number of different family names, may use the same, undifferenced coat of arms, and each coat of arms has its own name. The total number of coats of arms in this system was relatively low – ca. 160 (Piekosiński) in the late Middle Ages. The same can be also seen in Western Europe when families of different surnames but sharing clan origin would use similar coats-of-arms, the fleur-de-lis of the many Capetian families being perhaps the best-known example.

One side-effect of this unique arrangement was that it became customary to refer to noblemen by both their family name and their coat of arms name (or clan name). For example, Jan Zamoyski herbu Jelita means "Jan Zamoyski of the Jelita coat of arms" (though it is often translated as "of the clan Jelita" or herbu is Latinized de armis). From the 15th to 17th centuries, the formula seems to have been to copy the ancient Roman naming convention: praenomen (or given name), nomen gentile (or Gens/Clan name) and cognomen (surname), following the Renaissance fashion. So we have Jan Jelita Zamoyski, forming a double-barrelled name (nazwisko złożone, literally "compound name"). Later, the double-barrelled name began to be joined with a hyphen: Jan Jelita-Zamoyski. (See Polish names).

The Polish émigrés of the 19th century sometimes used adaptations of their names according to the Western European (mainly French) style, becoming e.g. Balthasar Klossowski de Rola (Balthus), Jean de Bloch (Jan Gotlib Bloch), or Tamara de Lempicka. Some would also keep the Latin forms of their surnames, as Latin was the official language of the Kingdom of Poland, hence the popularity of Late-Medieval or Early-Modern forms such as "de Zamosc Zamoyski".

A single coat of arms could appear in slightly different versions, typically in different colours, depending on the custom of the family using it. Such variations (odmiany) are still considered as representing the same coat of arms.

Ślepowron coat of arms

One of the most visually striking characteristics of Polish heraldry is the abundance of gules (red) fields. Among the oldest coats of arms in Poland, nearly half use a red background, with blue (azure) coming in a distant second. Nowhere else in Europe is there seen such a strong bias towards a particular colour scheme. It follows, however, the well-known heraldic custom of all Europe, of the vassals following the colour-scheme of their overlord, which found practical use on the battlefield.

Other typical features used in Polish heraldry include horseshoes, arrows, Maltese crosses, scythes, stars, and crescents. There are also many purely geometrical shapes for which a separate set of heraldic terms was invented. It has been suggested that originally all Polish coats of arms were based on such abstract geometrical shapes, but most were gradually "rationalized" into horseshoes, arrows and so on. If this hypothesis is correct, it suggests in turn that Polish heraldry, also unlike western European heraldry, may be at least partly derived from tamgas, marks used by Eurasian nomads such as the Sarmatians, Avars and Mongols, to mark property. Evidence of the origins of the system was considered scanty, and the hypothesis has been criticized as being part of "Sarmatism" (the Polish tradition of romanticizing their supposed Sarmatian ancestry). However, recent DNA projects that concern Polish Nobility proved that at least part of Polish Nobility is of Sarmatian origin.

A Polish coat of arms consists of shield, crest, helm, and crown. Mantling became fashionable during the 18th and 19th centuries. Supporters, mottos, and compartments normally do not appear, although certain individuals used them, especially in the final stages of the system's development, partly in response to French and German influence. Preserved medieval evidence shows Polish coats-of-arms with mantling and supporters.

=== Shield ===
Polish coats of arms are divided in the same way as their western counterparts. However, Polish coats of arms is applied on clans rather than to separate families and new families where adopted to the Clan, using same CoA. Thus Polish escutcheons are rarely parted, there are however a lot of preserved quartered coats-of-arms. These would most often show the arms of the four grandparents of the bearer. Or also the paternal-paternal great-grandmother in the 5th field if the male-line coat-of-arms goes in the heart field.

Example					
English name	Parted per fess	Parted per pale	Parted per bend sinister	Parted quarterly	Parted quarterly with an inescutcheon
Polish name	tarcza dwudzielna w pas	tarcza dwudzielna w słup	tarcza dwudzielna w lewy skos	tarcza czterodzielna w krzyż	tarcza czterodzielna w krzyż z polem sercowym

The tradition of differentiating between the coat of arms proper and a lozenge granted to women did not develop in Poland. By the 17th century, usually, men and women inherited a coat of arms from their father or mother or even both (or a member of a clan who had adopted them). But also men or women could permanently adopt the arms of their wives or husbands and transmit them to their children, even after remarriages. The brisure was rarely used. All children would inherit the coat(s) of arms of their parent(s) and transmit them to their children. This partly accounts for the relatively large proportion of Polish families who had adopted a coat of arms by the 18th century. Another factor was the trend of the nobly titled marrying "commoners" and passing on their title to their spouse and children, forbidden in the Middle Ages. An illegitimate child could adopt her/his noble mother's surname and title with the consent of the mother's father but was often adopted and raised by the natural father's family, thereby acquiring the father's surname and title.

Heart-shaped shields were mostly used in representations of the coats of arms of royalty. Following the union between Poland and Lithuania, and the creation of the elective monarchy, it became customary to place the coats of Poland and Lithuania diagonally, with the coat of arms of the specific monarch placed centrally on top. Research continues to find out what a "heart-shaped" shield is. Most likely, the coat of Poland was placed on the left-right diagonal (I & IV) and Lithuania on the right-left diagonal (II & III) as evidenced in the shield at the top of this page. The specific monarch crest then being placed in the "heart" position.

=== Tinctures ===
Tincture	English heraldic name	Polish heraldic name
Metals
Gold/Yellow	Or	Złoto
Silver/White	Argent	Srebro
Colours
Blue	Azure	Błękit
Red	Gules	Czerwień
Purple	Purpure	Purpura
Black	Sable	Czerń
Green	Vert	Zieleń

In addition to these seven basic tinctures, which were standard in western Europe, many more tinctures were used in Poland and (after the union with Poland) Lithuania.

== See also ==
- Heraldry
- History of Poland
- Armorial of Polish nobility
- Szlachta
- Belarusian heraldry
- Polish name
- Polish clans
- Coats of arms of Polish voivodeships

== Sources ==
- Górecki, Piotr (1992). Economy, Society, and Lordship in Medieval Poland: 1100-1250. New York, NEW YORK: Holmes and Meier Publishers, Inc. ISBN 0-8419-1318-8. OCLC 25787903.
- Manteuffel, Tadeusz (1982). The Formation of the Polish State: The Period of Ducal Rule, 963-1194. Detroit, MICHIGAN: Wayne State University Press. ISBN 0-8143-1682-4. OCLC 7730959.
- "Ślady recepcji legend arturiańskich w heraldyce Piastów czerskich i kronikach polskich". Kultura I Historia: Uniwersytet Marii Curie Skłodowskiej W Lublinie (in Polish). 2010 (17). 2010. ISSN 1642-9826.
- Wojciech Górczyk (2009). "Półksiężyc, orzeł, lew i smok. Uwagi o godłach napieczętnych Piastów". Histmag.org (in Polish). Histmag.
