= Jawor, Góra County =

Jawor
- Settlement
- Location within Poland
- Coordinates: 51°30′57″N 16°38′43″E
- Country: Poland
- Voivodeship: Lower Silesian
- County: Góra
- Gmina: Wąsosz
- Sołectwo: Drozdowice Wielkie

Jawor is a settlement in Gmina Wąsosz, Góra County, Lower Silesian Voivodeship, in south-western Poland.

From 1975 to 1998 the village was in Leszno Voivodeship.
