= Borowna =

- Settlement
- Location within Poland
- Coordinates: 51°35′09″N 16°47′38″E
- Country: Poland
- Voivodeship: Lower Silesian
- County: Góra
- Gmina: Wąsosz
- Sołectwo: Świniary

Borowna is a settlement in Gmina Wąsosz, Góra County, Lower Silesian Voivodeship, in south-western Poland.

From 1975 to 1998 the village was in Leszno Voivodeship.
