= Podmieście, Lower Silesian Voivodeship =

Podmieście
- Settlement
- Location within Poland
- Coordinates: 51°34′37″N 16°43′03″E
- Country: Poland
- Voivodeship: Lower Silesian
- County: Góra
- Gmina: Wąsosz
- Sołectwo: Pobiel

Podmieście is a settlement in Gmina Wąsosz, Góra County, Lower Silesian Voivodeship, in south-western Poland.

From 1975 to 1998 the village was in Leszno Voivodeship.
