= Sądowel =

- Settlement
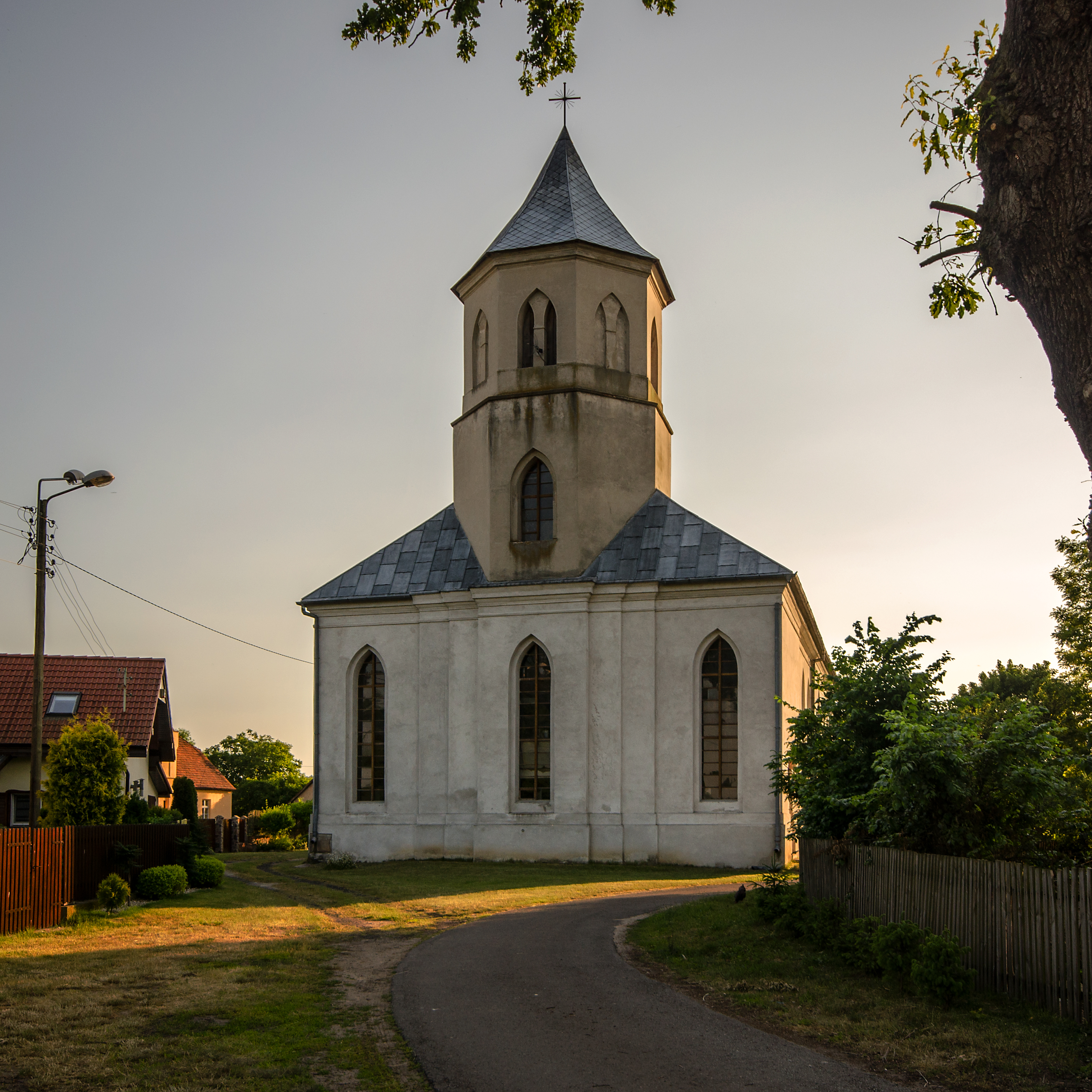

- Location within Poland
- Coordinates: 51°35′47″N 16°36′47″E
- Country: Poland
- Voivodeship: Lower Silesian
- County: Góra
- Gmina: Wąsosz
- Sołectwo: Lechitów

Sądowel is a settlement in Gmina Wąsosz, Góra County, Lower Silesian Voivodeship, in south-western Poland.

From 1975 to 1998 the village was in Leszno Voivodeship.
