= Unisławice, Lower Silesian Voivodeship =

Unisławice
- Settlement
- Location within Poland
- Coordinates: 51°31′58″N 16°47′08″E
- Country: Poland
- Voivodeship: Lower Silesian
- County: Góra
- Gmina: Wąsosz
- Sołectwo: Ługi

Unisławice is a settlement in Gmina Wąsosz, Góra County, Lower Silesian Voivodeship, in south-western Poland.

Between 1975 and 1998, the village was in Leszno Voivodeship.
