= Górka Wąsoska =

- Village
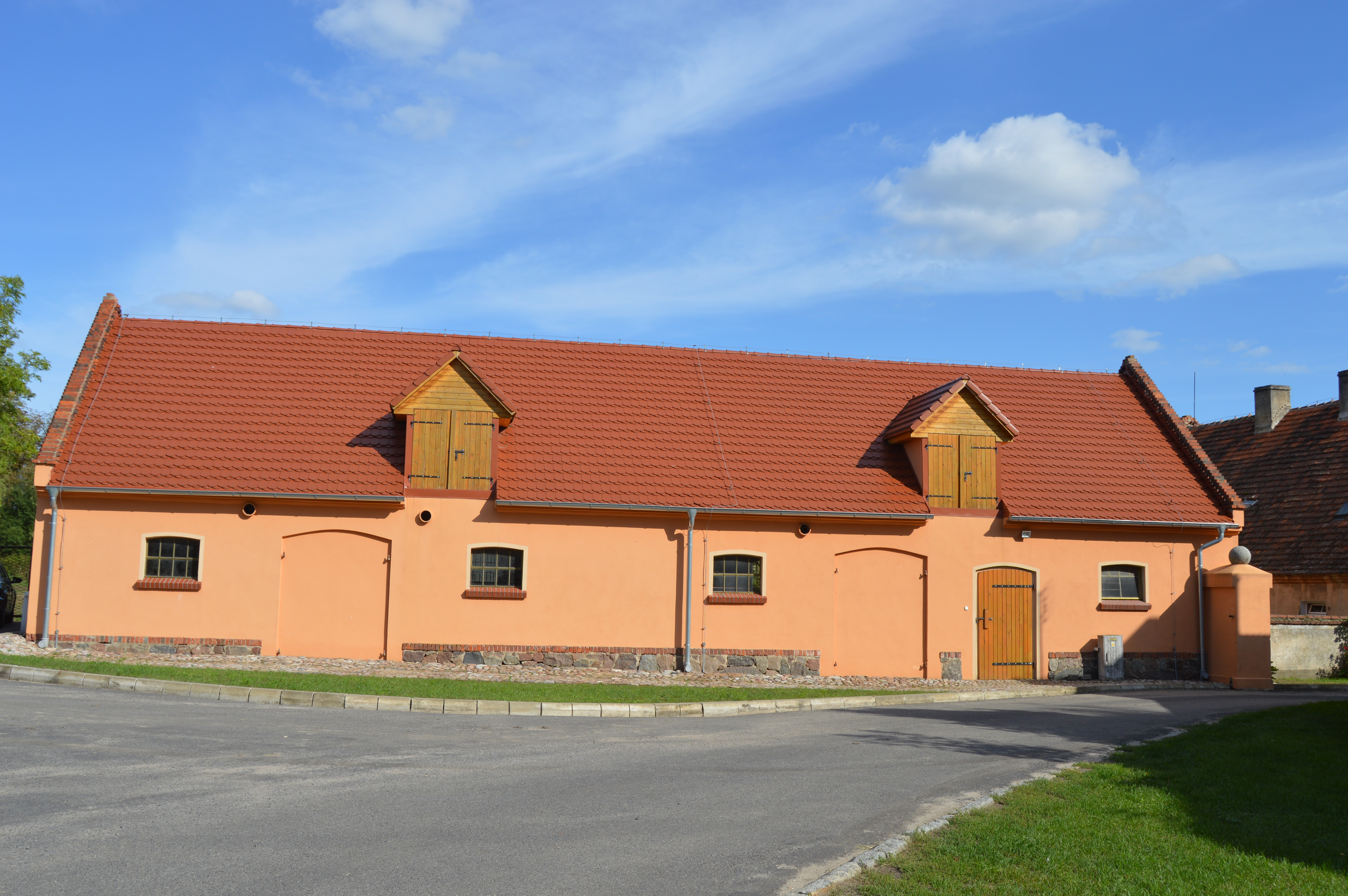

- Location within Poland
- Coordinates: 51°34′37″N 16°41′02″E
- Country: Poland
- Voivodeship: Lower Silesian
- Powiat: Góra
- Gmina: Wąsosz
- Time zone: UTC+1 (CET)
  - Summer (DST): UTC+2 (CEST)

Górka Wąsoska [ˈɡurka vɔ̃ˈsɔska] is a village in the administrative district of Gmina Wąsosz, within Góra County, Lower Silesian Voivodeship, in south-western Poland.

The name of the village is of Polish origin and comes from the word góra, which means "hill". The adjective Wąsoska was added after the nearby town of Wąsosz to distinguish it from other villages of the same name.
