= Stanowice =

Stanowice may refer to the following places in Poland:

- Stanowice, Góra County in Lower Silesian Voivodeship (south-west Poland)
- Stanowice, Oława County in Lower Silesian Voivodeship (south-west Poland)
- Stanowice, Świdnica County in Lower Silesian Voivodeship (south-west Poland)
- Stanowice, Silesian Voivodeship (south Poland)
- Stanowice, Lubusz Voivodeship (west Poland)
