= Masełkowice =

- Village
- Location within Poland
- Coordinates: 51°37′32″N 16°24′47″E
- Country: Poland
- Voivodeship: Lower Silesian
- Powiat: Góra
- Gmina: Niechlów
- Time zone: UTC+1 (CET)
  - Summer (DST): UTC+2 (CEST)
- Vehicle registration: DGR

Masełkowice [masɛu̯kɔˈvit͡sɛ] is a village in the administrative district of Gmina Niechlów, within Góra County, Lower Silesian Voivodeship, in south-western Poland.
