= Baranowice =

Baranowice may refer to the following places:

- Baranowice, Góra County in Lower Silesian Voivodeship (south-west Poland)
- Baranowice, Milicz County in Lower Silesian Voivodeship (south-west Poland)
- Baranowice, Wrocław County in Lower Silesian Voivodeship (south-west Poland)
- Baranowice, Lubusz Voivodeship (west Poland)
- Baranowice (Żory) in Silesian Voivodeship (south Poland)
- Baranowicze, the Polish name of Baranovichi, a city in Brest Province of western Belarus
