= Wronów, Lower Silesian Voivodeship =

Wronów
- Village
- Location within Poland
- Coordinates: 51°45′N 16°27′E
- Country: Poland
- Voivodeship: Lower Silesian
- Powiat: Góra
- Gmina: Niechlów
- Population: 393
- Time zone: UTC+1 (CET)
  - Summer (DST): UTC+2 (CEST)
- Vehicle registration: DGR

Wronów [ˈvrɔnuf] is a village in the administrative district of Gmina Niechlów, within Góra County, Lower Silesian Voivodeship, in south-western Poland.

The name of the village is of Polish origin and comes from the word wrona, which means "crow".
