= Luboszyce =

Luboszyce may refer to the following places in Poland:

- Luboszyce, Lower Silesian Voivodeship (south-west Poland)
- Luboszyce, Lubusz Voivodeship (west Poland)
- Luboszyce, Opole Voivodeship (south-west Poland)
