= Bogucin, Lower Silesian Voivodeship =

Bogucin
- Village
- Location within Poland
- Coordinates: 51°42′15″N 16°27′36″E
- Country: Poland
- Voivodeship: Lower Silesian
- Powiat: Góra
- Gmina: Niechlów

Bogucin [bɔˈɡut͡ɕin] is a village in the administrative district of Gmina Niechlów, within Góra County, Lower Silesian Voivodeship, in south-western Poland.
