= Wioska =

Wioska may refer to the following places in Poland:

- Wioska, Góra County in Lower Silesian Voivodeship (south-west Poland)
- Wioska, Oleśnica County in Lower Silesian Voivodeship (south-west Poland)
- Wioska, Kuyavian-Pomeranian Voivodeship (north-central Poland)
- Wioska, Greater Poland Voivodeship (west-central Poland)
