= Kietlów =

- Village
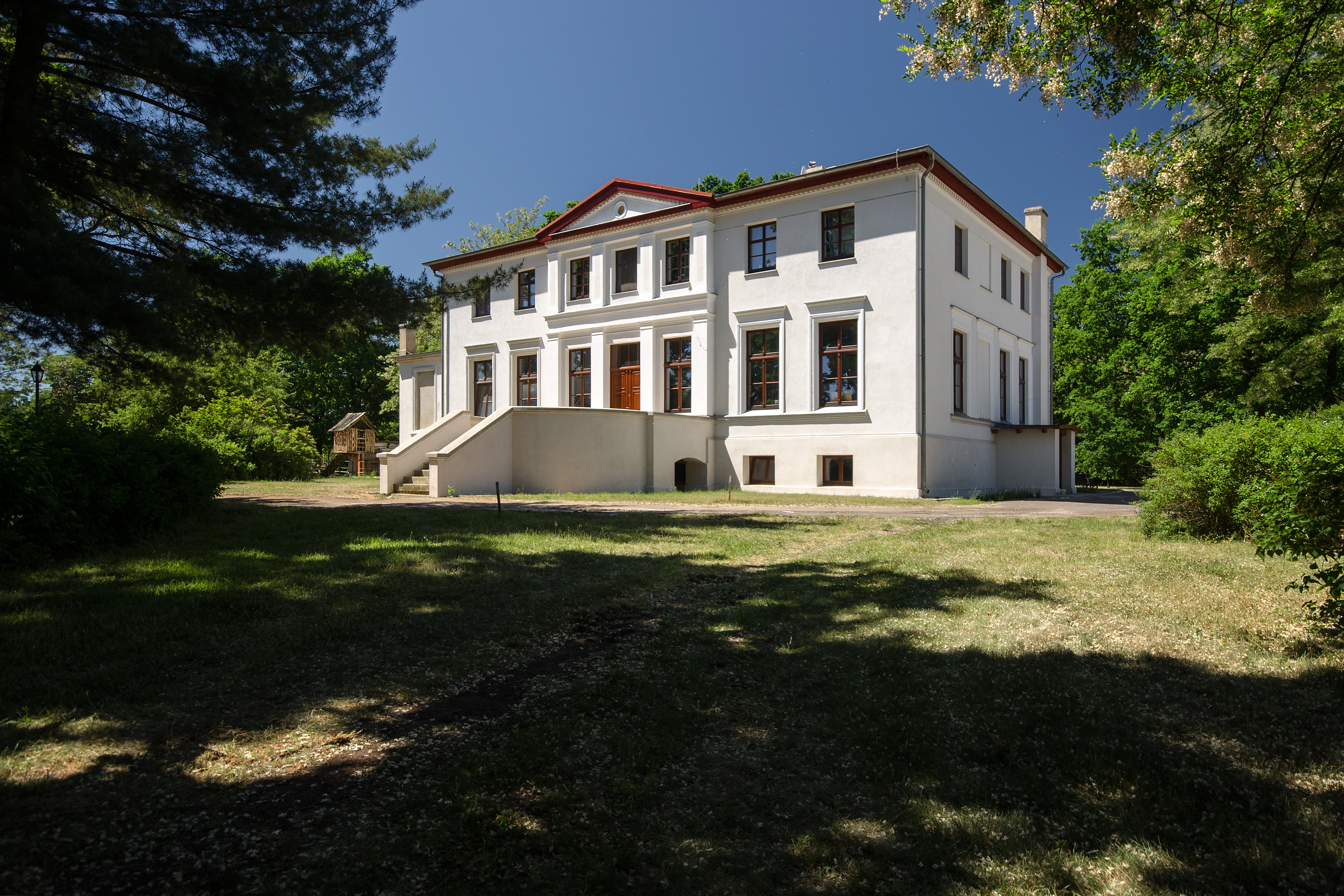
- Manor in Kietlów

- Location within Poland
- Coordinates: 51°37′24″N 16°26′09″E
- Country: Poland
- Voivodeship: Lower Silesian
- Powiat: Góra
- Gmina: Jemielno
- Time zone: UTC+1 (CET)
  - Summer (DST): UTC+2 (CEST)
- Vehicle registration: DGR

Kietlów [ˈkʲɛtluf] is a village in the administrative district of Gmina Jemielno, within Góra County, Lower Silesian Voivodeship, in southwestern Poland.
