= Siciny, Lower Silesian Voivodeship =

Siciny
- Village
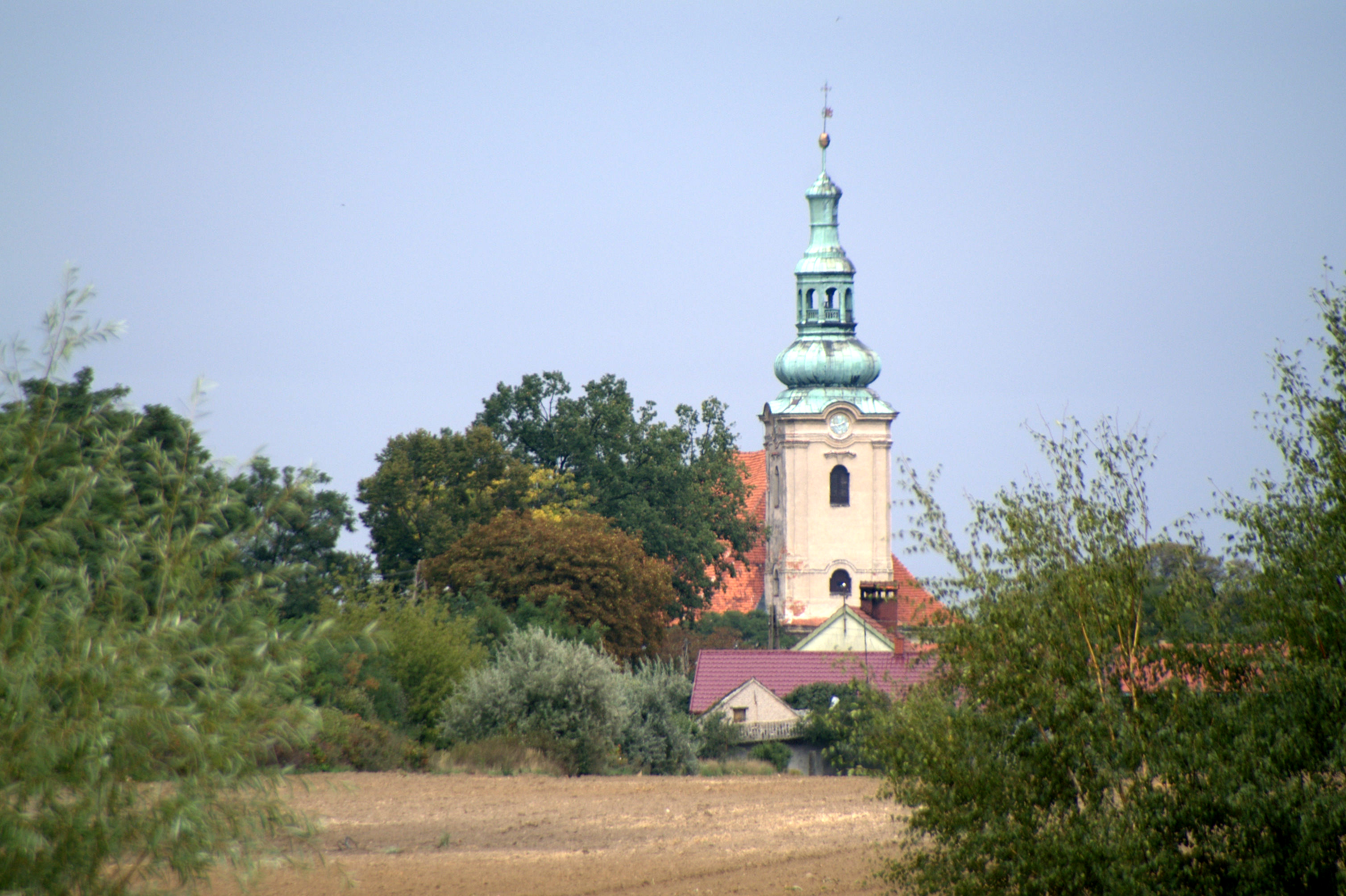
- Saint Martin church in Siciny

- Location within Poland
- Coordinates: 51°43′N 16°25′E
- Country: Poland
- Voivodeship: Lower Silesian
- County: Góra
- Gmina: Niechlów
- Elevation: 102 m (335 ft)

Population
  - Total: 550
- Time zone: UTC+1 (CET)
  - Summer (DST): UTC+2 (CEST)
- Vehicle registration: DGR
- Website: http://www.siciny.eu/

Siciny ([ɕiˈt͡ɕinɨ]) is a village in the administrative district of Gmina Niechlów, within Góra County, Lower Silesian Voivodeship, in south-western Poland.
