= Irządze =

Irządze may refer to the following places in Poland:

- Irządze, Lower Silesian Voivodeship (south-west Poland)
- Irządze, Silesian Voivodeship (south Poland)
