= Cieszkowice =

- Village
- Location within Poland
- Coordinates: 51°35′56″N 16°40′32″E
- Country: Poland
- Voivodeship: Lower Silesian
- Powiat: Góra
- Gmina: Wąsosz

Population
  - Total: 250
- (approximate)
- Time zone: UTC+1 (CET)
  - Summer (DST): UTC+2 (CEST)
- Vehicle registration: DGR

Cieszkowice [t͡ɕɛʂkɔˈvit͡sɛ] is a village in the administrative district of Gmina Wąsosz, within Góra County, Lower Silesian Voivodeship, in western Poland.

The village has an approximate population of 250.
