= Chobienia =

Chobienia may refer to:

- Chobienia, Góra County, Poland
- Chobienia, Lubin County, Poland
