= Piotrowice Małe =

Piotrowice Małe may refer to the following places in Poland:

- Piotrowice Małe, Lower Silesian Voivodeship (south-west Poland)
- Piotrowice Małe, Warmian-Masurian Voivodeship (north Poland)
