= Ostrawa =

Ostrawa may refer to:

- Ostrawa, Lower Silesian Voivodeship, a village in south-west Poland
- The Polish name for the Czech city of Ostrava
