= Gola Wąsoska =

- Village
- Location within Poland
- Coordinates: 51°35′14″N 16°41′59″E
- Country: Poland
- Voivodeship: Lower Silesian
- Powiat: Góra
- Gmina: Wąsosz
- Elevation: 165 m (541 ft)

Population
  - Total: 100
- Time zone: UTC+1 (CET)
  - Summer (DST): UTC+2 (CEST)
- Vehicle registration: DGR

Gola Wąsoska [ˈɡɔla vɔ̃ˈsɔska] is a village in the administrative district of Gmina Wąsosz, within Góra County, Lower Silesian Voivodeship, in western Poland.
