= Wiklina, Lower Silesian Voivodeship =

Wiklina
- Village
- Location within Poland
- Coordinates: 51°36′07″N 16°43′33″E
- Country: Poland
- Voivodeship: Lower Silesian
- Powiat: Góra
- Gmina: Wąsosz
- Time zone: UTC+1 (CET)
  - Summer (DST): UTC+2 (CEST)
- Vehicle registration: DGR

Wiklina [viˈklina] is a village in the administrative district of Gmina Wąsosz, within Góra County, Lower Silesian Voivodeship, in south-western Poland.

The name of the village is of Polish origin and its name means "wicker".
