= Luboszyce Małe =

- Village
- Location within Poland
- Coordinates: 51°35′44″N 16°26′59″E
- Country: Poland
- Voivodeship: Lower Silesian
- County: Góra
- Gmina: Jemielno
- Time zone: UTC+1 (CET)
  - Summer (DST): UTC+2 (CEST)
- Vehicle registration: DGR

Luboszyce Małe [lubɔˈʂɨt͡sɛ ˈmawɛ] is a village in the administrative district of Gmina Jemielno, within Góra County, Lower Silesian Voivodeship, in south-western Poland.
