= Tarpno =

Tarpno may refer to the following places in Poland:

- Tarpno, Lower Silesian Voivodeship (south-west Poland)
- Tarpno, Warmian-Masurian Voivodeship (north Poland)
