= Bieliszów =

- Village
- Location within Poland
- Coordinates: 51°31′57″N 16°29′05″E
- Country: Poland
- Voivodeship: Lower Silesian
- Powiat: Góra
- Gmina: Jemielno

Bieliszów [bjɛˈliʂuf] is a village in the administrative district of Gmina Jemielno, within Góra County, Lower Silesian Voivodeship, in south-western Poland.
