= Cieszyny =

Cieszyny may refer to the following places in Poland:

- Cieszyny, Lower Silesian Voivodeship (south-west Poland)
- Cieszyny, Kuyavian-Pomeranian Voivodeship (north-central Poland)
