= Daszów =

- Village
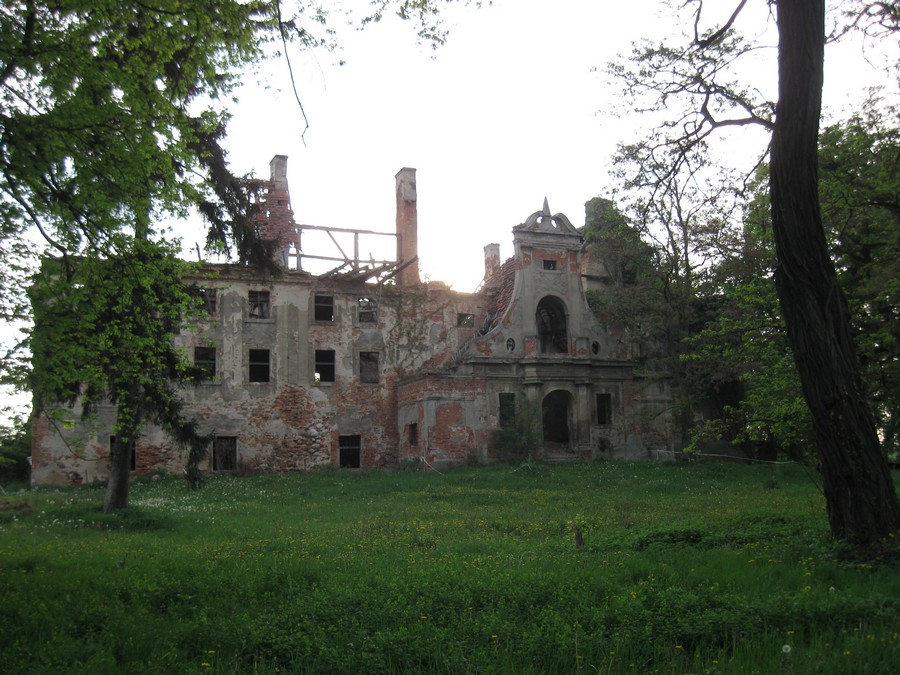
- Daszów Palace ruins

- Location within Poland
- Coordinates: 51°33′21″N 16°36′05″E
- Country: Poland
- Voivodeship: Lower Silesian
- Powiat: Góra
- Gmina: Jemielno

Population
  - Total: 160
- (approximate)
- Time zone: UTC+1 (CET)
  - Summer (DST): UTC+2 (CEST)
- Vehicle registration: DGR

Daszów [ˈdaʂuf] is a village in the administrative district of Gmina Jemielno, within Góra County, Lower Silesian Voivodeship, in south-western Poland.
