= Łękanów =

- Village
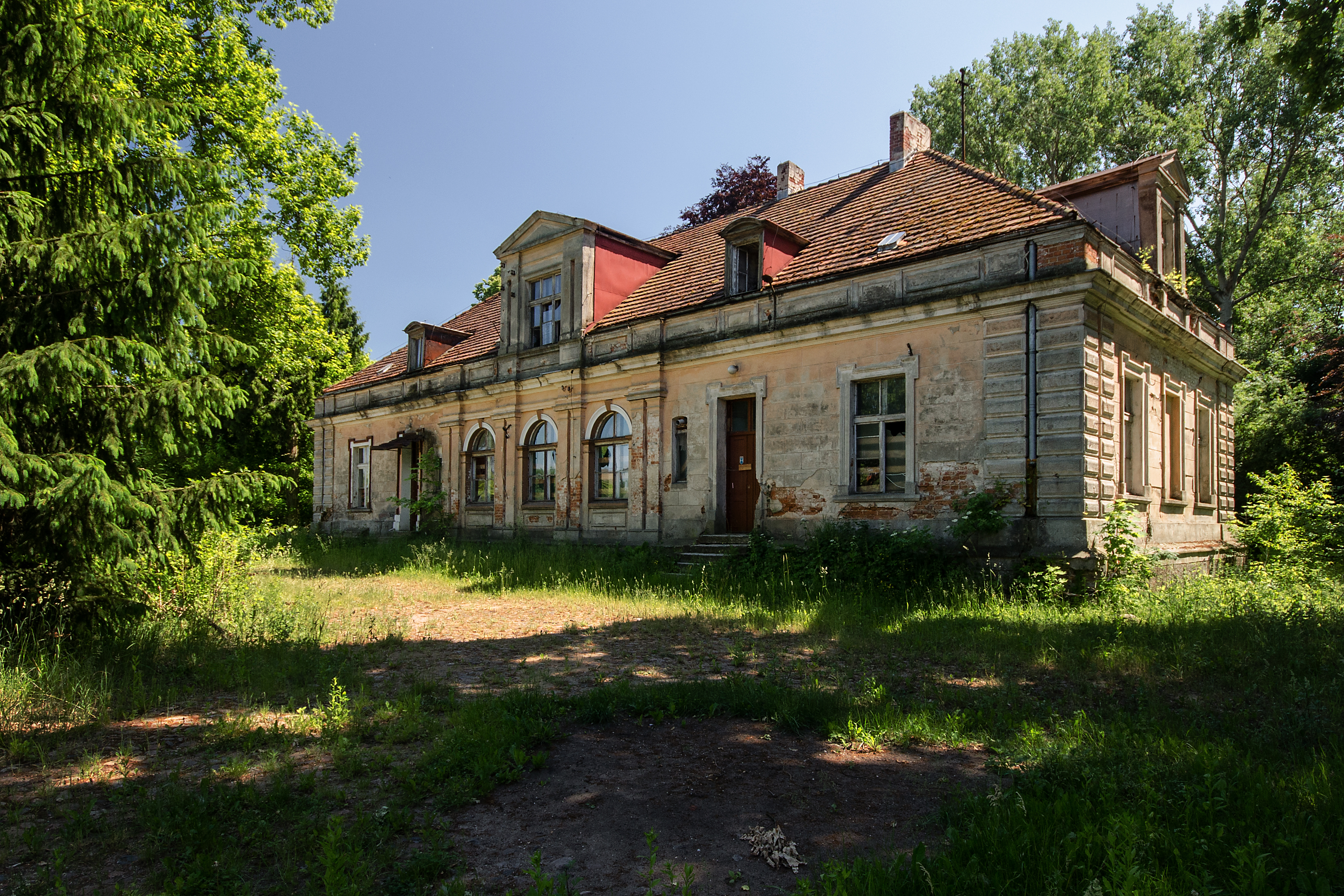
- Old manor house in Łękanów

- Location within Poland
- Coordinates: 51°43′N 16°25′E
- Country: Poland
- Voivodeship: Lower Silesian
- Powiat: Góra
- Gmina: Niechlów
- Time zone: UTC+1 (CET)
  - Summer (DST): UTC+2 (CEST)
- Vehicle registration: DGR

Łękanów [wɛnˈkanuf] is a village in the administrative district of Gmina Niechlów, within Góra County, Lower Silesian Voivodeship, in western Poland.

== History and landmarks ==
From the 14th century, the village has been known under various names, which included Lankanow and Lanka. In the 18th century, it was annexed by Prussia, and from 1871 it was part of the German Empire, within which, as Lanken it was administratively located in the Province of Lower Silesia and was property of Counts of Schlabrendorf, who had a majorat in the palace of Seppau (Szczepów), some 20 kilometers away. Between 1860 and 1945 the village served as an auxiliary residence of the counts, who had a manor house built at the western outskirts of the village.

After the defeat of Nazi Germany in World War II, in 1945, borders shifted and the region became again part of Poland, although with a Soviet-installed communist regime. The name was changed to Łękanów and the Schlabrendorfs were expropriated. The manor was divided and parts of it were given to a collective farm run by the state. By the time communism collapsed in 1989, the manor house and outbuildings had been heavily transformed, with the manor house turned into apartments for collective farm staff.

A state-owned agency which owned the remnants of the manor—more than six hectares of land and buildings—sold it in 2013 to a private owner who plans to restore the manor house to its 19th-century shape, renovate the outbuildings as well as rebuild ruined structures to house a hotel. Part of the property, in particular an 18th-century granary, will house a nonprofit cultural institution.

The manor in its entirety is a listed heritage site.
