= Żuchlów =

- Village
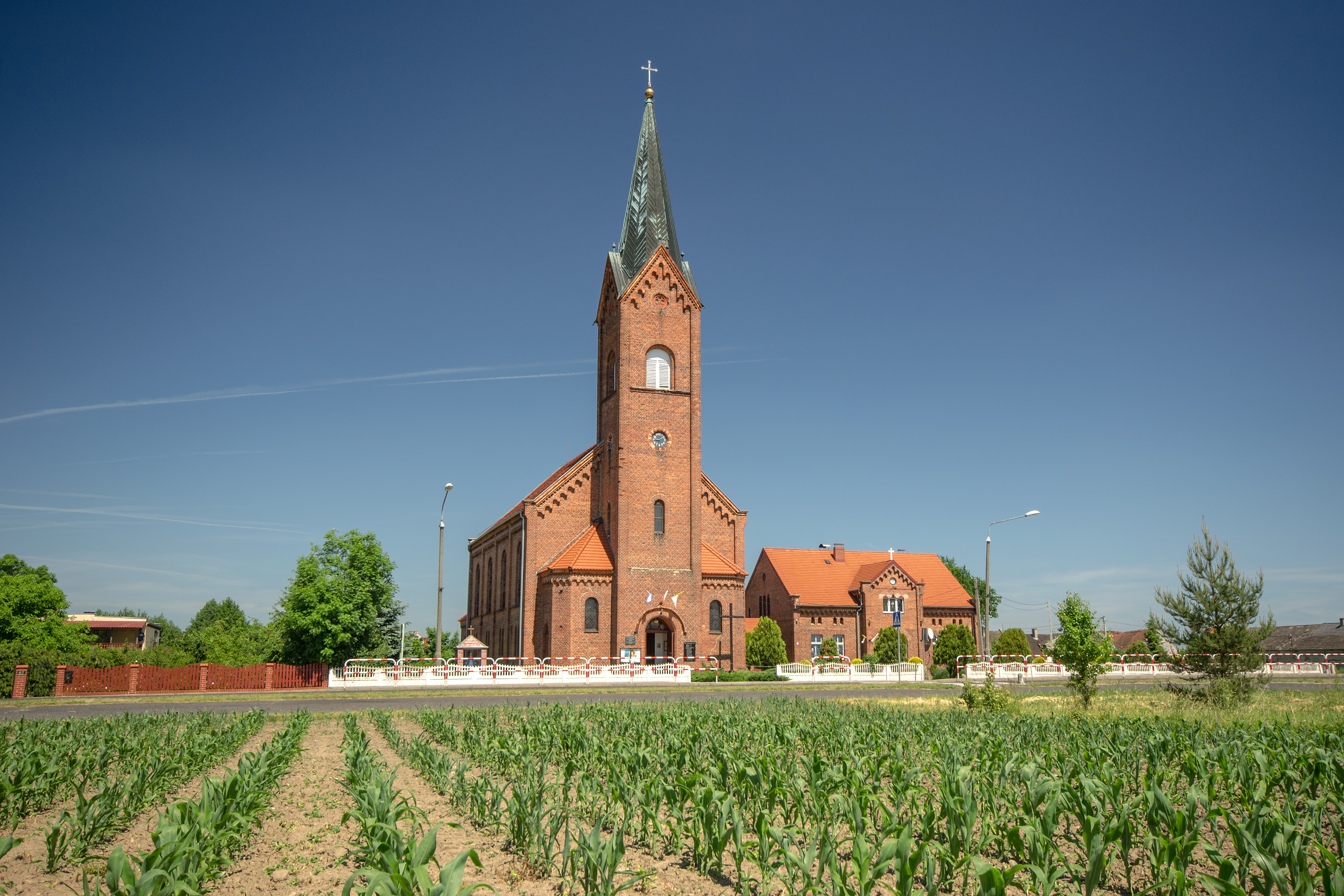
- Holy Spirit Church in Żuchlów

- Location within Poland
- Coordinates: 51°40′43″N 16°24′21″E
- Country: Poland
- Voivodeship: Lower Silesian
- County: Góra
- Gmina: Niechlów
- Time zone: UTC+1 (CET)
  - Summer (DST): UTC+2 (CEST)
- Vehicle registration: DGR

Żuchlów [ˈʐuxluf] is a village in the administrative district of Gmina Niechlów, within Góra County, Lower Silesian Voivodeship, in south-western Poland.
