= Bartodzieje, Lower Silesian Voivodeship =

Bartodzieje
- Village
- Location within Poland
- Coordinates: 51°40′51″N 16°19′33″E
- Country: Poland
- Voivodeship: Lower Silesian
- Powiat: Góra
- Gmina: Niechlów

Bartodzieje [bartɔˈd͡ʑɛjɛ] is a village in the administrative district of Gmina Niechlów, within Góra County, Lower Silesian Voivodeship, in south-western Poland.
