= Bartków, Góra County =

Bartków
- Village
- Location within Poland
- Coordinates: 51°30′57″N 16°46′26″E
- Country: Poland
- Voivodeship: Lower Silesian
- Powiat: Góra
- Gmina: Wąsosz

Bartków [ˈbartkuf] is a village in the administrative district of Gmina Wąsosz, within Góra County, Lower Silesian Voivodeship, in south-western Poland.
