= Kamień Górowski =

- Village
- Location within Poland
- Coordinates: 51°30′36″N 16°42′06″E
- Country: Poland
- Voivodeship: Lower Silesian
- Powiat: Góra
- Gmina: Wąsosz
- Population: 290

Kamień Górowski (Polish pronunciation: [ˈkamjɛj̃ ɡuˈrɔfskʲi]) is a village in the administrative district of Gmina Wąsosz, within Góra County, Lower Silesian Voivodeship, in south-western Poland.
