= Zawiszów =

Zawiszów may refer to the following places in Poland:

- Zawiszów, Góra County in Gmina Jemielno, Góra County in Lower Silesian Voivodeship (SW Poland)
- Zawiszów, Świdnica County in Gmina Świdnica, Świdnica County in Lower Silesian Voivodeship (SW Poland)
