= Zdziesławice, Lower Silesian Voivodeship =

Zdziesławice
- Village
- Location within Poland
- Coordinates: 51°32′36″N 16°31′12″E
- Country: Poland
- Voivodeship: Lower Silesian
- Powiat: Góra
- Gmina: Jemielno

Zdziesławice [zd͡ʑɛswaˈvit͡sɛ] is a village in the administrative district of Gmina Jemielno, within Góra County, Lower Silesian Voivodeship, in south-western Poland.
