= Świerczów, Lower Silesian Voivodeship =

Świerczów
- Village
- Location within Poland
- Coordinates: 51°40′38″N 16°17′14″E
- Country: Poland
- Voivodeship: Lower Silesian
- County: Góra
- Gmina: Niechlów
- Time zone: UTC+1 (CET)
  - Summer (DST): UTC+2 (CEST)
- Vehicle registration: DGR

Świerczów (Polish pronunciation: [ˈɕfjɛrt͡ʂuf]) is a village in the administrative district of Gmina Niechlów, within Góra County, Lower Silesian Voivodeship, in south-western Poland.
