= Naratów =

- Village
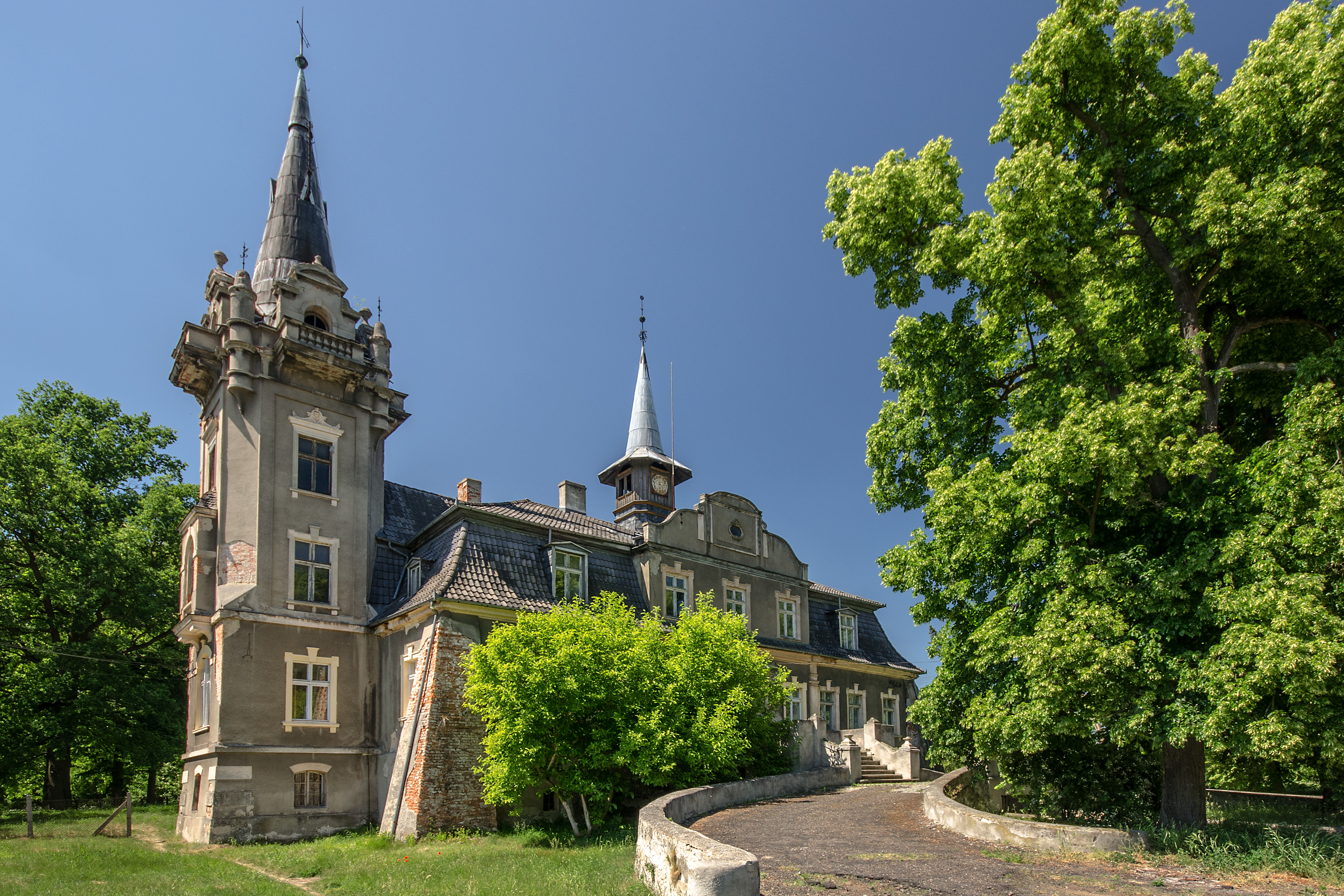
- Naratów Palace

- Location within Poland
- Coordinates: 51°41′40″N 16°25′49″E
- Country: Poland
- Voivodeship: Lower Silesian
- Powiat: Góra
- Gmina: Niechlów
- Time zone: UTC+1 (CET)
  - Summer (DST): UTC+2 (CEST)
- Vehicle registration: DGR

Naratów [naˈratuf] is a village in the administrative district of Gmina Niechlów, within Góra County, Lower Silesian Voivodeship, in south-western Poland.
