= Głobice =

- Village
- Location within Poland
- Coordinates: 51°38′29″N 16°20′45″E
- Country: Poland
- Voivodeship: Lower Silesian
- Powiat: Góra
- Gmina: Niechlów

Głobice [ɡwɔˈbit͡sɛ] is a village in the administrative district of Gmina Niechlów, within Góra County, Lower Silesian Voivodeship, in south-western Poland.
