= Unisławice =

Unisławice may refer to the following places in Poland:

- Unisławice, Lower Silesian Voivodeship (south-west Poland)
- Unisławice, Kuyavian-Pomeranian Voivodeship (north-central Poland)
