= Rudna Mała =

Rudna Mała may refer to the following places in Poland:

- Rudna Mała, Lower Silesian Voivodeship (south-west Poland)
- Rudna Mała, Subcarpathian Voivodeship (south-east Poland)
