= Uszczonów =

- Village
- Location within Poland
- Coordinates: 51°36′18″N 16°24′24″E
- Country: Poland
- Voivodeship: Lower Silesian
- County: Góra
- Gmina: Jemielno

Uszczonów [uʂˈt͡ʂɔnuf] is a village in the administrative district of Gmina Jemielno, within Góra County, Lower Silesian Voivodeship, in south-western Poland.
