= Sułów Wielki =

- Village
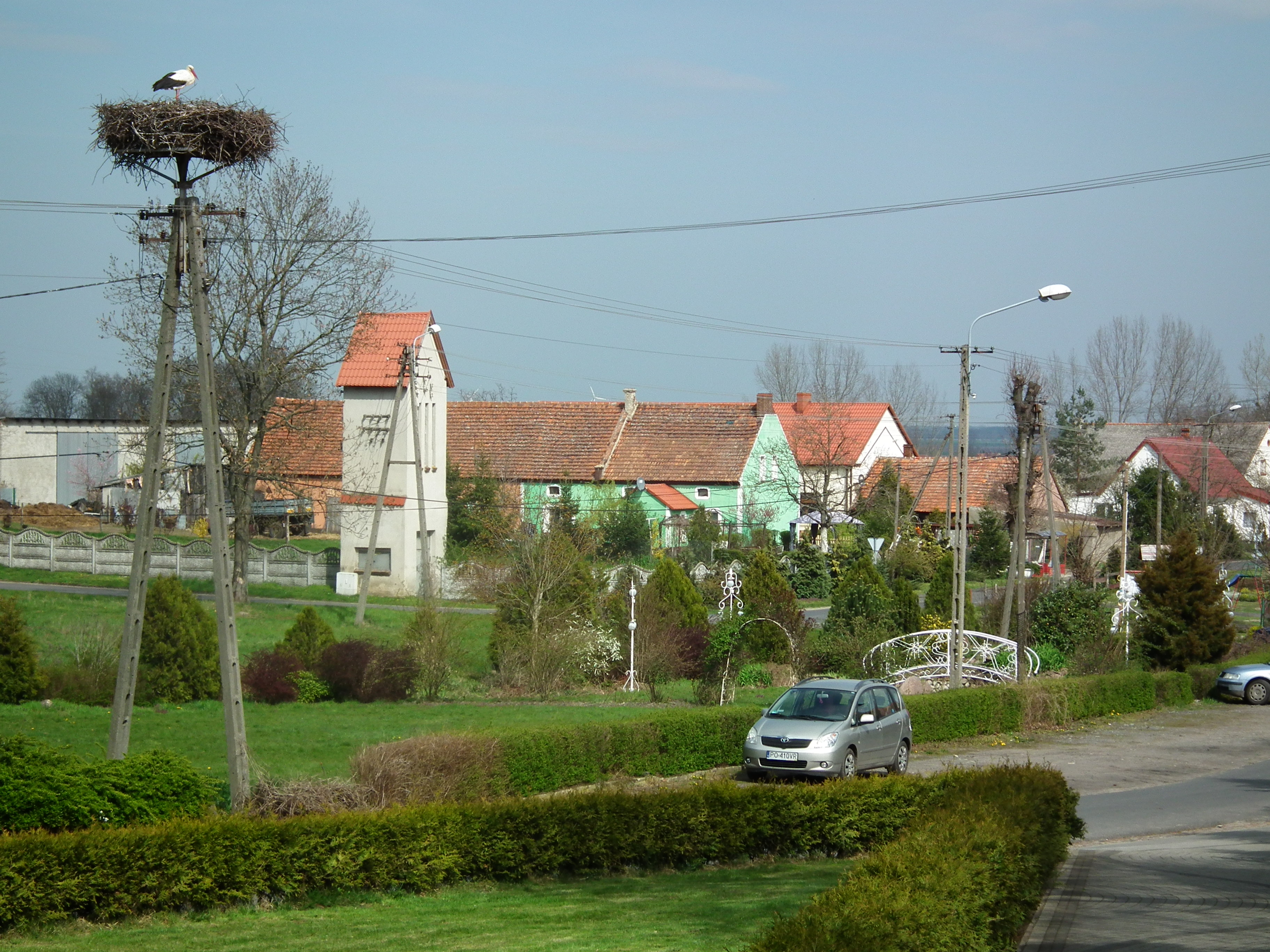

- Location within Poland
- Coordinates: 51°38′N 16°42′E
- Country: Poland
- Voivodeship: Lower Silesian
- County: Góra
- Gmina: Wąsosz

Sułów Wielki (Polish pronunciation: [ˈsuwuv ˈvjɛlkʲi]) is a village in the administrative district of Gmina Wąsosz, within Góra County, Lower Silesian Voivodeship, in south-western Poland.
