= Bełcz Mały =

- Village
- Location within Poland
- Coordinates: 51°34′41″N 16°39′12″E
- Country: Poland
- Voivodeship: Lower Silesian
- Powiat: Góra
- Gmina: Wąsosz

Bełcz Mały (Polish pronunciation: [bɛwtʂ ˈmawɨ]) is a village in the administrative district of Gmina Wąsosz, within Góra County, Lower Silesian Voivodeship, in south-western Poland.
