= Piskorze =

Piskorze may refer to the following places in Poland:

- Piskorze, Lower Silesian Voivodeship (south-west Poland)
- Piskorze, Warmian-Masurian Voivodeship (north Poland)
