= Czeladź Mała =

- Village
- Location within Poland
- Coordinates: 51°31′19″N 16°35′30″E
- Country: Poland
- Voivodeship: Lower Silesian
- Powiat: Góra
- Gmina: Jemielno
- Time zone: UTC+1 (CET)
  - Summer (DST): UTC+2 (CEST)
- Vehicle registration: DGR

Czeladź Mała [ˈt͡ʂɛlat͡ɕ ˈmawa] is a village in the administrative district of Gmina Jemielno, within Góra County, Lower Silesian Voivodeship, in south-western Poland.

Under Nazi Germany, the village was renamed to Ursiedel from 1936 to 1945 to erase traces of Polish origin.
