= Rudna Wielka =

Rudna Wielka may refer to the following places in Poland:

- Rudna Wielka, Lower Silesian Voivodeship (south-west Poland)
- Rudna Wielka, Podkarpackie Voivodeship (south-east Poland)
