= Ciechanów, Lower Silesian Voivodeship =

Village in Lower Silesian Voivodeship, Poland

Ciechanów
- Village
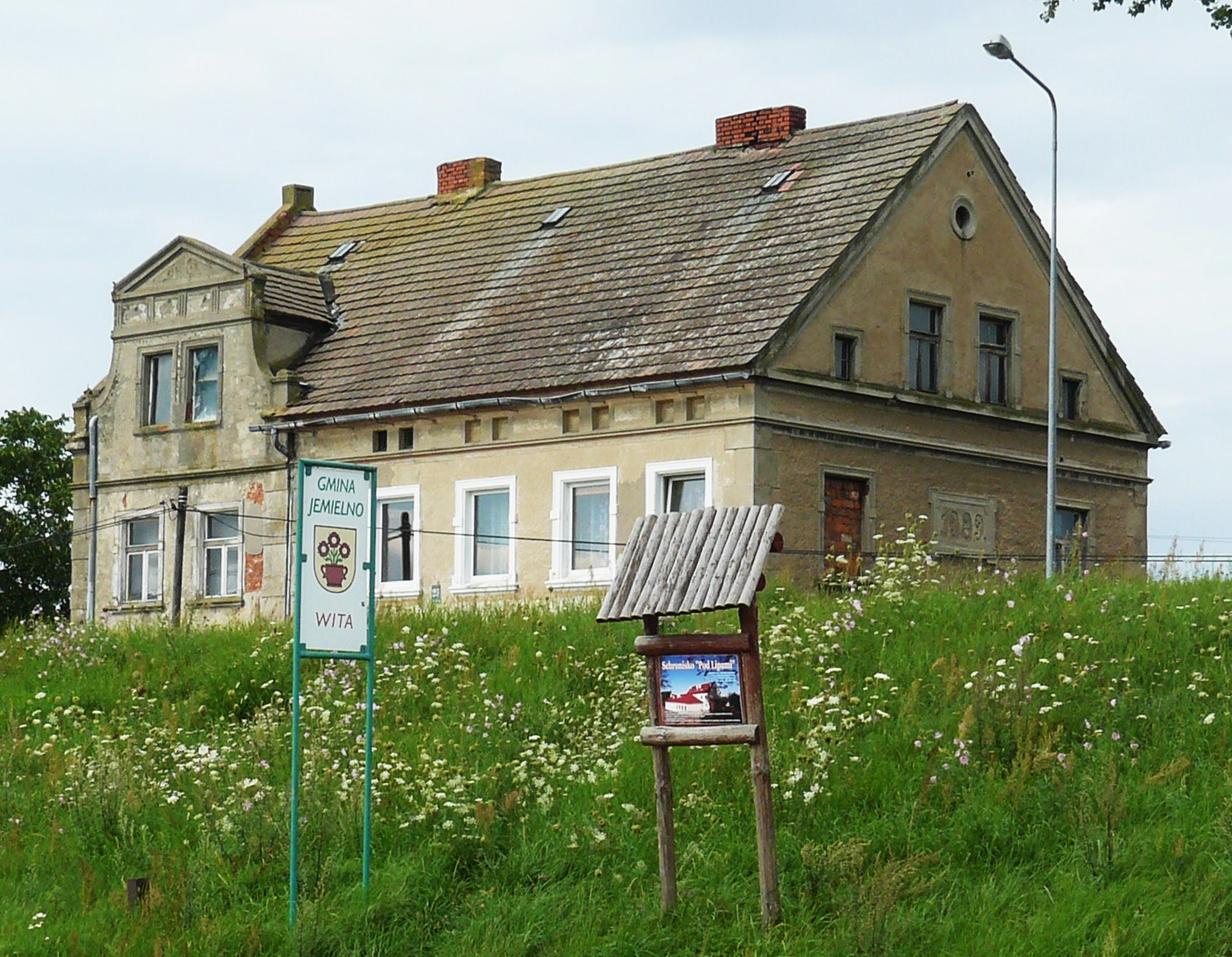

- Location within Poland
- Coordinates: 51°34′38″N 16°25′57″E
- Country: Poland
- Voivodeship: Lower Silesian
- Powiat: Góra
- Gmina: Jemielno

Ciechanów (Polish pronunciation: [t͡ɕeˈxanuf]) is a village in the administrative district of Gmina Jemielno, within Góra County, Lower Silesian Voivodeship, in south-western Poland.
