= Chorągwice =

- Village
- Location within Poland
- Coordinates: 51°34′55″N 16°28′17″E
- Country: Poland
- Voivodeship: Lower Silesian
- County: Góra
- Gmina: Jemielno

Chorągwice [xɔrɔnɡˈvit͡sɛ] is a village in the administrative district of Gmina Jemielno, within Góra County, Lower Silesian Voivodeship, in south-western Poland.
