= Borki, Lower Silesian Voivodeship =

Borki
- Village
- Location within Poland
- Coordinates: 51°30′35″N 16°30′47″E
- Country: Poland
- Voivodeship: Lower Silesian
- Powiat: Góra
- Gmina: Jemielno

Borki [ˈbɔrki] is a village in the administrative district of Gmina Jemielno, within Góra County, Lower Silesian Voivodeship, in south-western Poland.
