= Gmina Wąsosz, Lower Silesian Voivodeship =

Gmina Wąsosz Wąsosz Commune
- Gmina
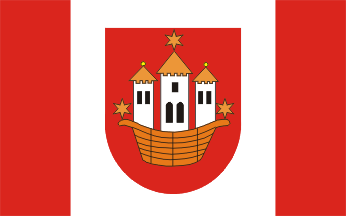
- Flag Coat of arms
- Interactive map of Gmina Wąsosz
- Coordinates (Wąsosz): 51°33′N 16°42′E
- Country: Poland
- Voivodeship: Lower Silesian
- County: Góra
- Seat: Wąsosz
- Sołectwos: Baranowice, Bartków, Bełcz Górny, Bełcz Mały, Chocieborowice, Cieszkowice, Czarnoborsko, Czeladź Wielka, Dochowa, Drozdowice Małe, Drozdowice Wielkie, Gola Wąsoska-Górka Wąsoska, Kąkolno, Kamień Górowski, Kowalowo, Lechitów, Lubiel, Ługi-Unisławice, Ostrawa, Płoski, Pobiel, Rudna Mała, Rudna Wielka, Sułów Wielki, Świniary, Wiewierz, Wiklina, Wodniki, Wrząca Śląska, Wrząca Wielka, Zbaków Dolny, Zbaków Górny

Area
  - Total: 193.59 km^{2} (74.75 sq mi)

Population (2019-06-30)
  - Total: 7,161
  - Density: 36.99/km^{2} (95.81/sq mi)
- Website: http://wasosz.eu/

Gmina Wąsosz is an urban-rural gmina (administrative district) in Góra County, Lower Silesian Voivodeship, in south-western Poland. Its seat is the town of Wąsosz, which lies approximately 17 kilometres (11 mi) southeast of Góra and 53 km (33 mi) northwest of the regional capital Wrocław.

The gmina covers an area of 193.59 square kilometres (74.75 sq mi), and as of 2019 its total population was 7,161.

== Neighbouring gminas ==
Gmina Wąsosz is bordered by the gminas of Bojanowo, Góra, Jemielno, Rawicz, Wińsko, and Żmigród.

== Villages ==
Apart from the town of Wąsosz, the gmina contains the villages of Baranowice, Bartków, Bełcz Górny, Bełcz Mały, Borowna, Chocieborowice, Cieszkowice, Czaple, Czarnoborsko, Czeladź Wielka, Dochowa, Drozdowice Małe, Drozdowice Wielkie, Gola Wąsoska, Górka Wąsoska, Jawor, Kąkolno, Kamień Górowski, Kobylniki, Kowalowo, Lechitów, Lubiel, Ługi, Marysin, Młynary, Ostrawa, Płoski, Pobiel, Podmieście, Rudna Mała, Rudna Wielka, Sądowel, Stefanów, Sułów Wielki, Świniary, Unisławice, Wiewierz, Wiklina, Wodniki, Wrząca Śląska, Wrząca Wielka, Zbaków Dolny, Zbaków Górny and Zubrza.
