= Tarpno, Lower Silesian Voivodeship =

Tarpno
- Village
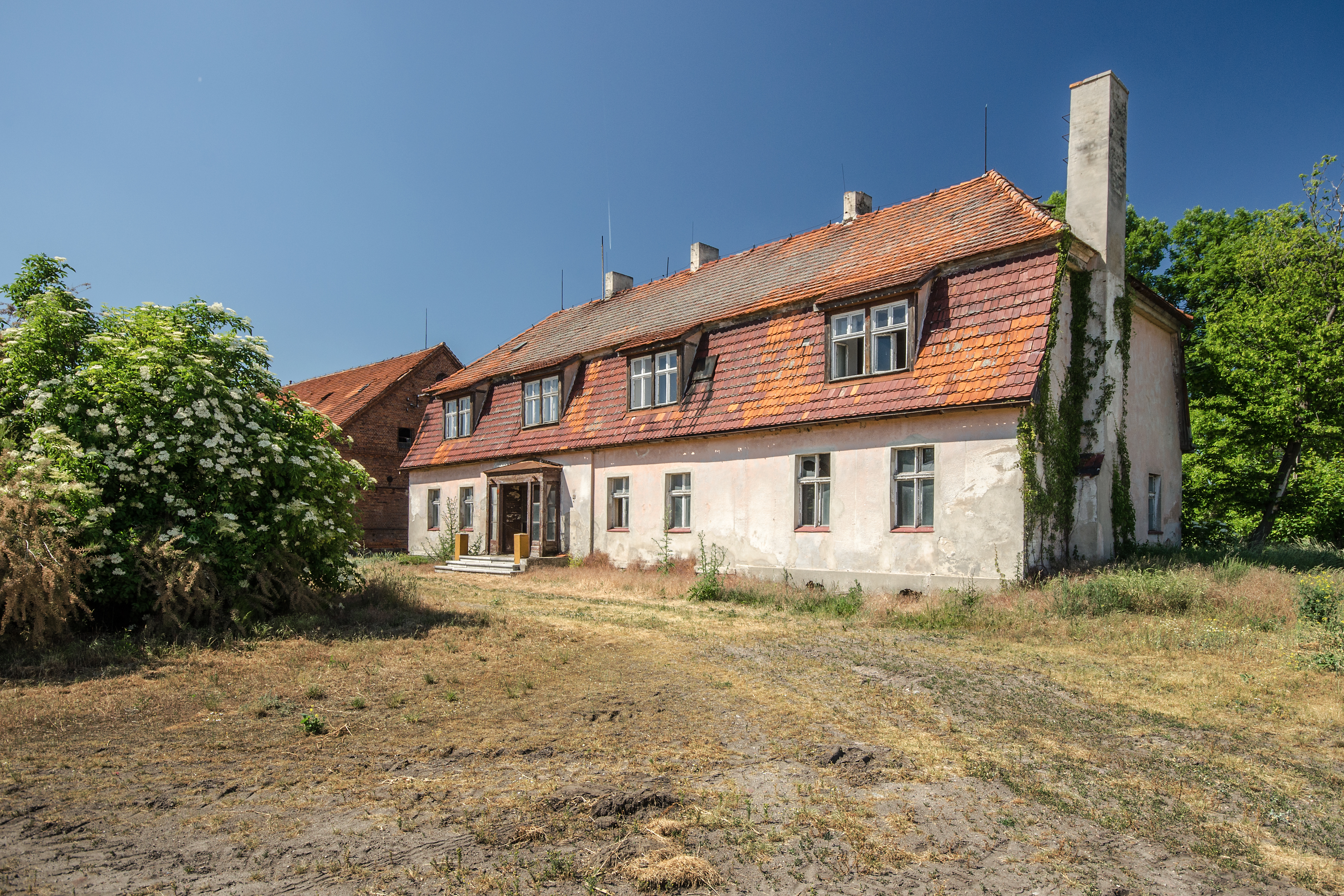

- Location within Poland
- Coordinates: 51°44′N 16°28′E
- Country: Poland
- Voivodeship: Lower Silesian
- Powiat: Góra
- Gmina: Niechlów

Population
  - Total: 200
- Time zone: UTC+1 (CET)
  - Summer (DST): UTC+2 (CEST)
- Vehicle registration: DGR

Tarpno [ˈtarpnɔ] is a village in the administrative district of Gmina Niechlów, within Góra County, Lower Silesian Voivodeship, in south-western Poland.
