= Świniary, Góra County =

Świniary
- Village
- Location within Poland
- Coordinates: 51°34′43″N 16°46′23″E
- Country: Poland
- Voivodeship: Lower Silesian
- Powiat: Góra
- Gmina: Wąsosz

Population (2011)
  - Total: 176
- Time zone: UTC+1 (CET)
  - Summer (DST): UTC+2 (CEST)
- Vehicle registration: DGR

Świniary [ɕfiˈɲarɨ] is a village in the administrative district of Gmina Wąsosz, within Góra County, Lower Silesian Voivodeship, in south-western Poland.

== History ==
Świniary dates back to the medieval Piast-ruled Kingdom of Poland. In the medieval Liber fundationis episcopatus Vratislaviensis it was mentioned under the Latinized name Swinari. The name of the village is of Polish origin and comes from the word świnia, which means "pig". During World War II, the Germans established a forced labour camp for Belgians, Poles, Russians and Czechs in the village.
