= Chobienia, Góra County =

Chobienia
- Village
- Location within Poland
- Coordinates: 51°32′50″N 16°27′36″E
- Country: Poland
- Voivodeship: Lower Silesian
- Powiat: Góra
- Gmina: Jemielno
- Time zone: UTC+1 (CET)
  - Summer (DST): UTC+2 (CEST)
- Vehicle registration: DGR

Chobienia [xɔˈbjɛɲa] is a village in the administrative district of Gmina Jemielno, within Góra County, Lower Silesian Voivodeship, in south-western Poland.
