= Rudna Wielka, Lower Silesian Voivodeship =

Rudna Wielka
- Village
- Location within Poland
- Coordinates: 51°38′12″N 16°40′56″E
- Country: Poland
- Voivodeship: Lower Silesian
- Powiat: Góra
- Gmina: Wąsosz
- Time zone: UTC+1 (CET)
  - Summer (DST): UTC+2 (CEST)
- Vehicle registration: DGR

Rudna Wielka [ˈrudna ˈvjɛlka] is a village in the administrative district of Gmina Wąsosz, within Góra County, Lower Silesian Voivodeship, in western Poland.
