= Irządze, Lower Silesian Voivodeship =

Irządze
- Village
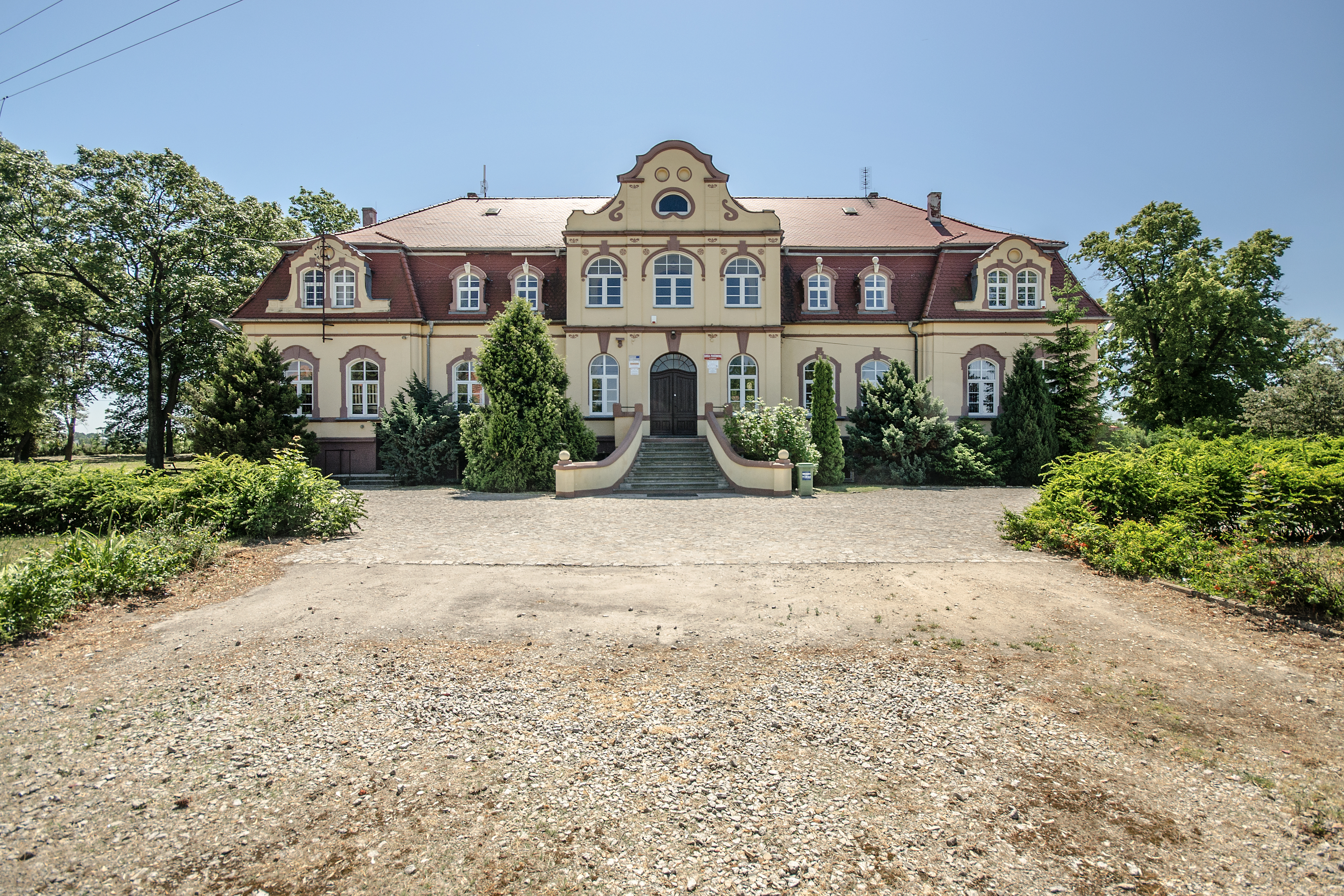
- Irządze Palace

- Location within Poland
- Coordinates: 51°35′32″N 16°25′35″E
- Country: Poland
- Voivodeship: Lower Silesian
- County: Góra
- Gmina: Jemielno
- Time zone: UTC+1 (CET)
  - Summer (DST): UTC+2 (CEST)
- Vehicle registration: DGR

Irządze [iˈʐɔnd͡zɛ] (translation: And I rule) is a village in the administrative district of Gmina Jemielno, within Góra County, Lower Silesian Voivodeship, in south-western Poland.
