= Gmina Jemielno =

Gmina Jemielno Jemielno Commune
- Gmina
- Coat of arms
- Interactive map of Gmina Jemielno
- Coordinates (Jemielno): 51°31′27″N 16°32′40″E
- Country: Poland
- Voivodeship: Lower Silesian
- County: Góra
- Seat: Jemielno
- Sołectwos: Bieliszów, Chorągwice, Ciechanów, Cieszyny, Daszów, Irządze, Jemielno, Kietlów, Łęczyca, Luboszyce, Luboszyce Małe, Lubów, Osłowice, Piotrowice Małe, Piskorze, Psary, Śleszów, Smolne, Uszczonów, Zdziesławice

Area
  - Total: 123.8 km^{2} (47.8 sq mi)

Population (2019-06-30)
  - Total: 3,019
  - Density: 24.39/km^{2} (63.16/sq mi)
- Website: http://jemielno.pl/

Gmina Jemielno is a rural gmina (administrative district) in Góra County, Lower Silesian Voivodeship, in southwestern Poland. Its seat is the village of Jemielno, which lies approximately 16 kilometres (9.9 mi) south of Góra and 56 km (35 mi) north-west of Wrocław, the regional capital.

The gmina covers an area of 123.8 square kilometres (47.8 sq mi), and as of 2019 its total population was 3,019.

== Neighbouring gminas ==
Gmina Jemielno is bordered by the gminas of Góra, Niechlów, Rudna, Wąsosz and Wińsko.

== Villages ==
The gmina contains the villages of Bieliszów, Borki, Chobienia, Chorągwice, Ciechanów, Cieszyny, Czeladź Mała, Daszów, Irządze, Jemielno, Kietlów, Łęczyca, Luboszyce, Luboszyce Małe, Lubów, Majówka, Osłowice, Piotrowice Małe, Piskorze, Psary, Równa, Śleszów, Smolne, Stanowice, Uszczonów, Zawiszów and Zdziesławice.
