= Zawiszów, Góra County =

Zawiszów
- Village
- Location within Poland
- Coordinates: 51°33′22″N 16°33′33″E
- Country: Poland
- Voivodeship: Lower Silesian
- Powiat: Góra
- Gmina: Jemielno

Zawiszów [zaˈviʂuf] is a village in the administrative district of Gmina Jemielno, within Góra County, Lower Silesian Voivodeship, in south-western Poland.
