= Baranowice, Góra County =

Baranowice
- Village
- Location within Poland
- Coordinates: 51°33′37″N 16°37′15″E
- Country: Poland
- Voivodeship: Lower Silesian
- Powiat: Góra
- Gmina: Wąsosz

Baranowice [baranɔˈvit͡sɛ] is a village in the administrative district of Gmina Wąsosz, within Góra County, Lower Silesian Voivodeship, in south-western Poland.
