= Ługi, Lower Silesian Voivodeship =

Ługi
- Village
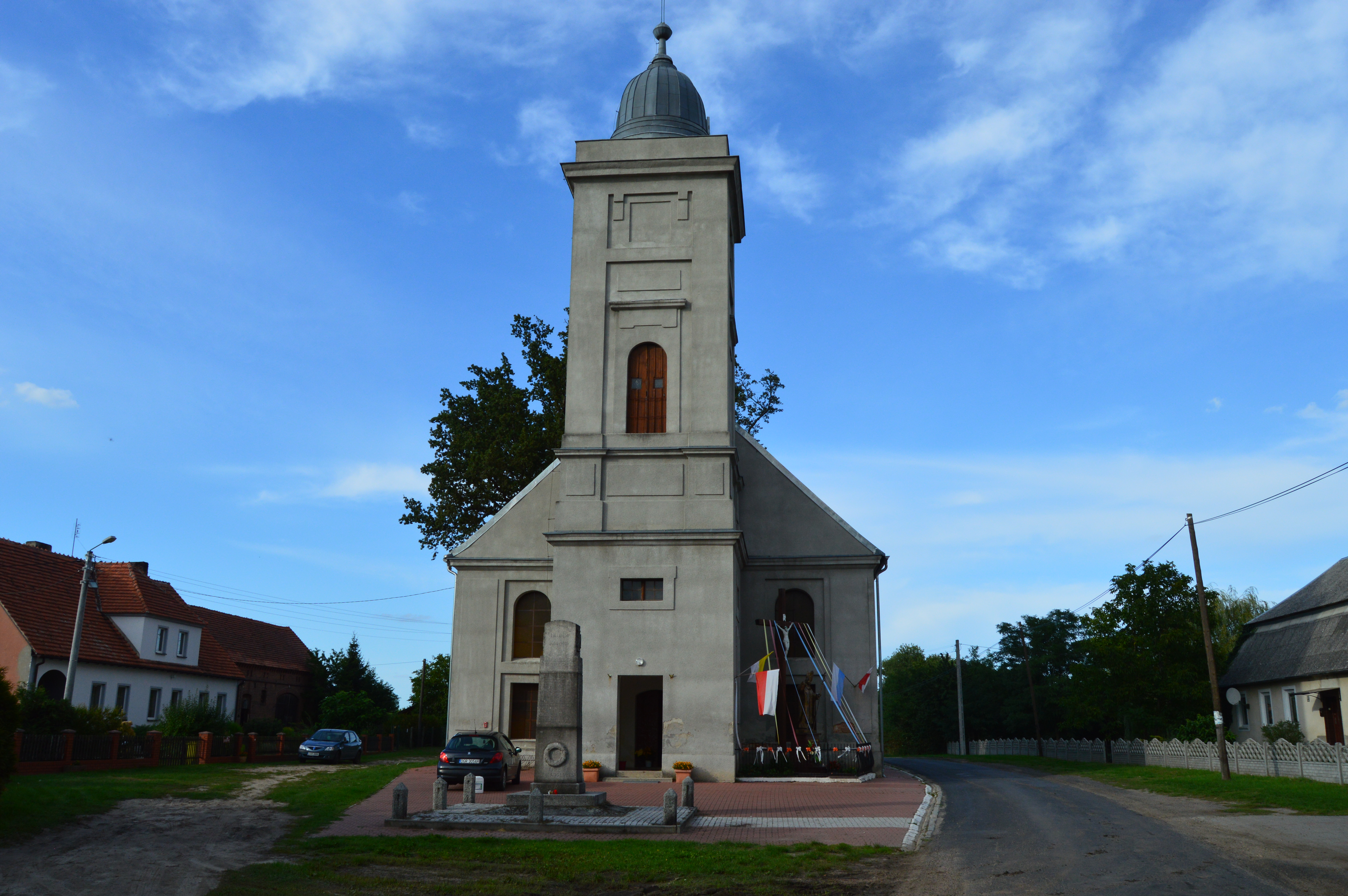
- Church of the Assumption of the Blessed Virgin Mary in Ługi

- Location within Poland
- Coordinates: 51°32′N 16°45′E
- Country: Poland
- Voivodeship: Lower Silesian
- Powiat: Góra
- Gmina: Wąsosz
- Time zone: UTC+1 (CET)
  - Summer (DST): UTC+2 (CEST)
- Vehicle registration: DGR

Ługi [ˈwuɡi] is a village in the administrative district of Gmina Wąsosz, within Góra County, Lower Silesian Voivodeship, in western Poland.
