= Czeladź Wielka =

- Village
- Location within Poland
- Coordinates: 51°34′12″N 16°38′02″E
- Country: Poland
- Voivodeship: Lower Silesian
- Powiat: Góra
- Gmina: Wąsosz
- Time zone: UTC+1 (CET)
  - Summer (DST): UTC+2 (CEST)
- Vehicle registration: DGR

Czeladź Wielka [ˈt͡ʂɛlat͡ɕ ˈvjɛlka] is a village in the administrative district of Gmina Wąsosz, within Góra County, Lower Silesian Voivodeship, in western Poland.
