= Gmina Niechlów =

Gmina Niechlów Niechlów Commune
- Gmina
- Coat of arms
- Interactive map of Gmina Niechlów
- Coordinates (Niechlów): 51°41′N 16°22′E
- Country: Poland
- Voivodeship: Lower Silesian
- County: Góra
- Seat: Niechlów

Area
  - Total: 151.98 km^{2} (58.68 sq mi)

Population (2019-06-30)
  - Total: 4,911
  - Density: 32.31/km^{2} (83.69/sq mi)
- Website: http://www.niechlow.pl

Gmina Niechlów is a rural gmina (administrative district) in Góra County, Lower Silesian Voivodeship, in south-western Poland. Its seat is the village of Niechlów, which lies approximately 13 kilometres (8 mi) west of Góra and 78 km (48 mi) north-west of the regional capital Wrocław.

The gmina covers an area of 151.98 square kilometres (58.68 sq mi), and as of 2019 its total population was 4,911.

== Neighbouring gminas ==
Gmina Niechlów is bordered by the gminas of Góra, Jemielno, Pęcław, Rudna and Szlichtyngowa.

== Villages ==
The gmina contains the villages of Bartodzieje, Bełcz Wielki, Bogucin, Głobice, Karów, Klimontów, Łękanów, Lipowiec, Masełkowice, Miechów, Naratów, Niechlów, Siciny, Świerczów, Szaszorowice, Tarpno, Wągroda, Wioska, Wroniniec, Wronów, Żabin and Żuchlów.

== Twin towns – sister cities ==
Gmina Niechlów is twinned with:

- Röderaue, Germany
