= Niechlów =

- Village
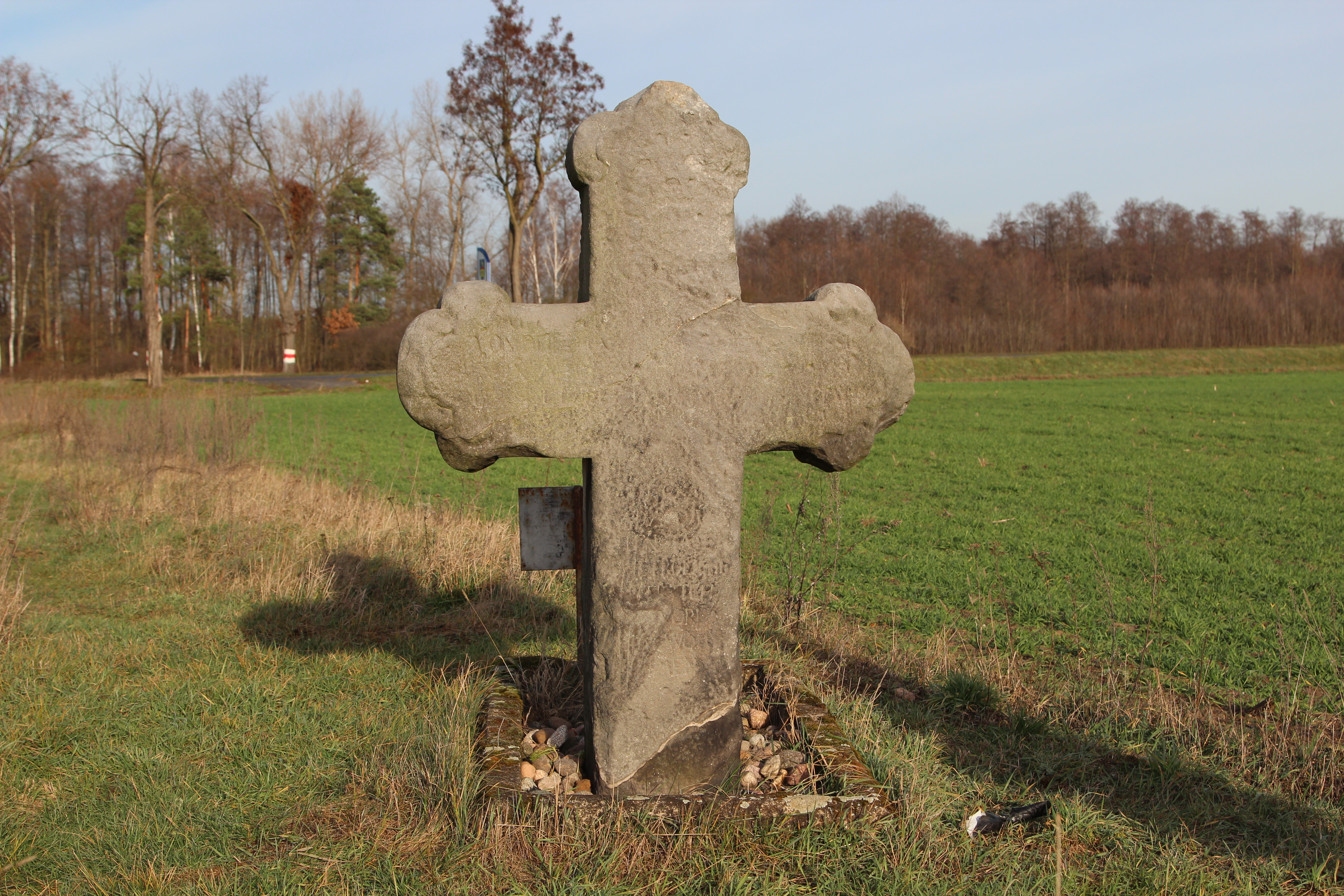
- Stone cross

- Coat of arms

- Location within Poland
- Coordinates: 51°41′N 16°22′E
- Country: Poland
- Voivodeship: Lower Silesian
- Powiat: Góra
- Gmina: Niechlów

Niechlów [ˈɲɛxluf] is a village in Góra County, Lower Silesian Voivodeship, in western Poland. It is the seat of the administrative district (gmina) called Gmina Niechlów.
