= Rudna Mała, Lower Silesian Voivodeship =

Rudna Mała
- Village
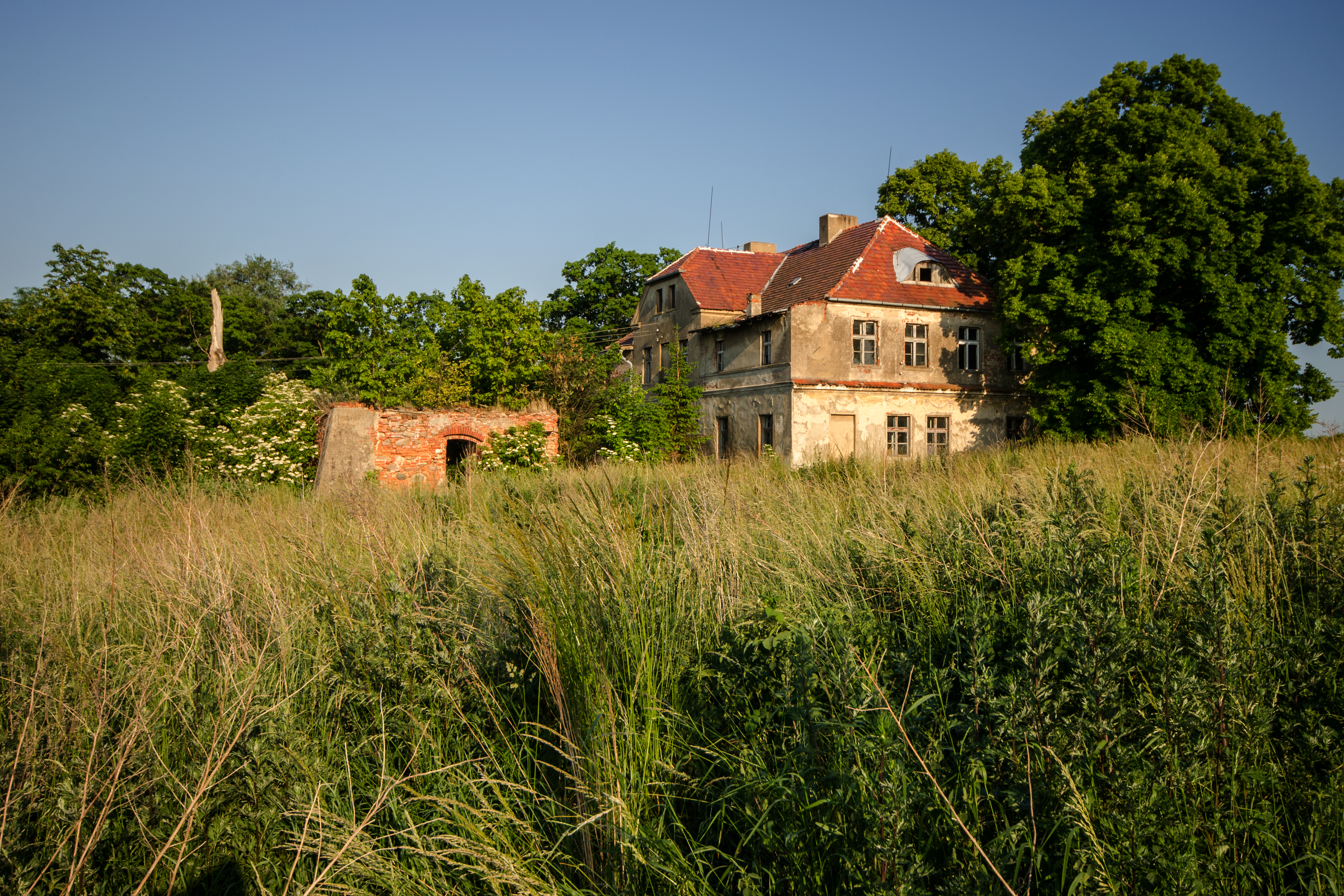
- Palace in Rudna Mała

- Location within Poland
- Coordinates: 51°37′50″N 16°40′59″E
- Country: Poland
- Voivodeship: Lower Silesian
- County: Góra
- Gmina: Wąsosz
- Time zone: UTC+1 (CET)
  - Summer (DST): UTC+2 (CEST)
- Vehicle registration: DGR

Rudna Mała [ˈrudna ˈmawa] is a village in the administrative district of Gmina Wąsosz, within Góra County, Lower Silesian Voivodeship, in western Poland.
