= Stanowice, Góra County =

Stanowice
- Village
- Location within Poland
- Coordinates: 51°34′11″N 16°36′00″E
- Country: Poland
- Voivodeship: Lower Silesian
- Powiat: Góra
- Gmina: Jemielno
- Time zone: UTC+1 (CET)
  - Summer (DST): UTC+2 (CEST)
- Vehicle registration: DGR

Stanowice [stanɔˈvit͡sɛ] is a village in the administrative district of Gmina Jemielno, within Góra County, Lower Silesian Voivodeship, in south-western Poland.
