= Lechitów =

- Village
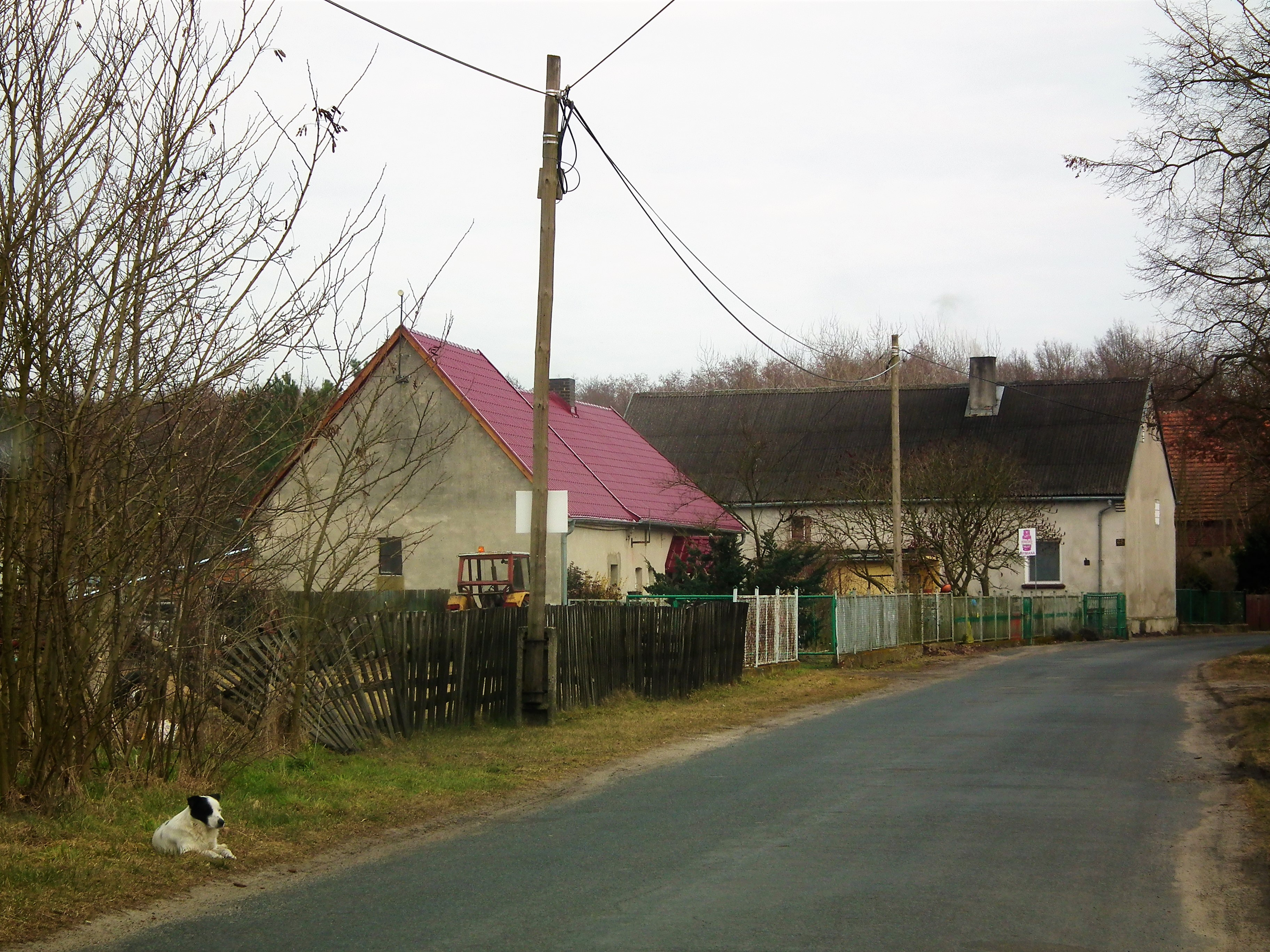
- Roadside view in Lechitów

- Location within Poland
- Coordinates: 51°35′50″N 16°37′21″E
- Country: Poland
- Voivodeship: Lower Silesian
- County: Góra
- Gmina: Wąsosz
- Time zone: UTC+1 (CET)
  - Summer (DST): UTC+2 (CEST)
- Vehicle registration: DGR

Lechitów [lɛˈxituf] is a village in the administrative district of Gmina Wąsosz, within Góra County, Lower Silesian Voivodeship, in western Poland.
