= Jemielno =

- Village
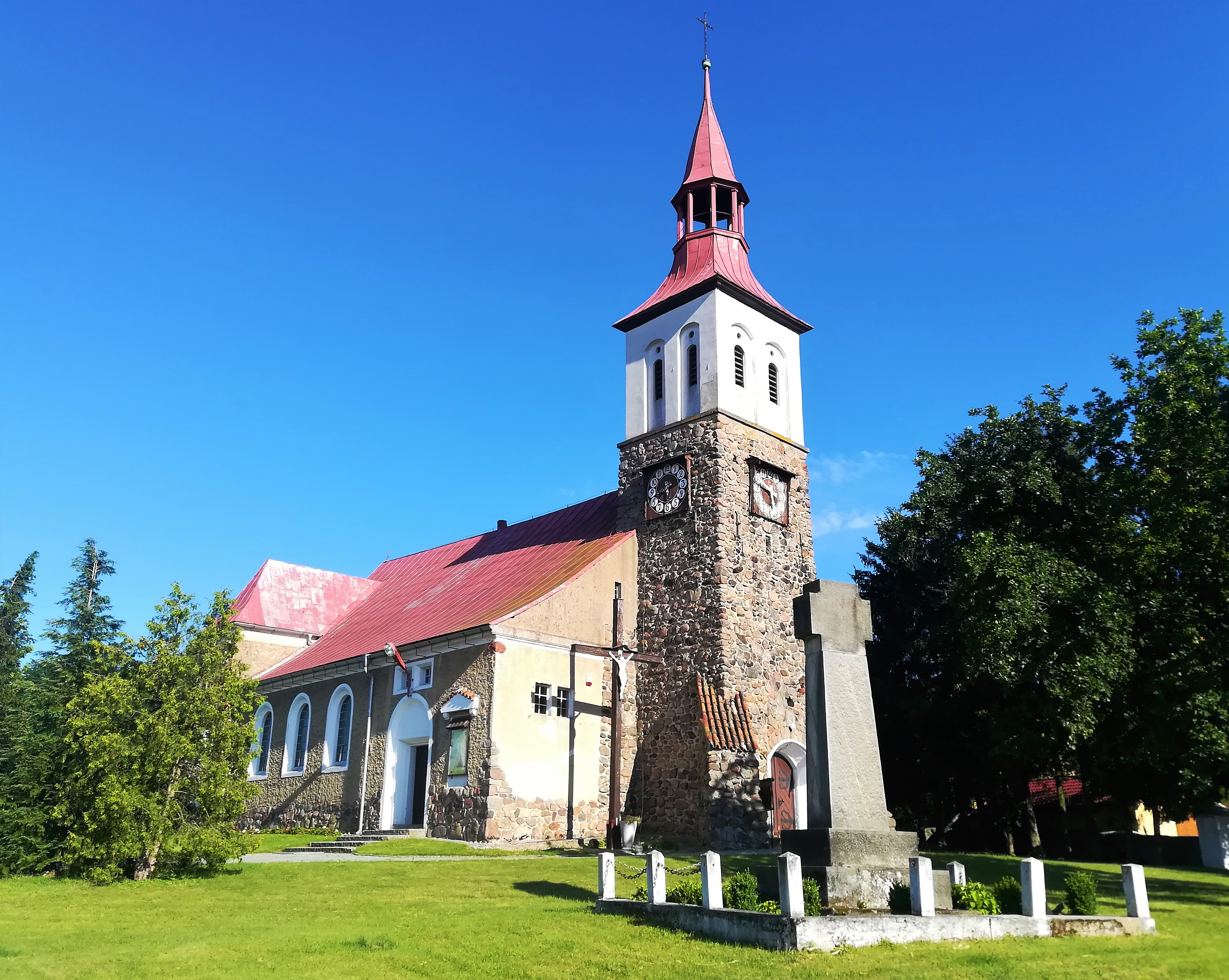
- Catholic church

- Coat of arms

- Location within Poland
- Coordinates: 51°31′27″N 16°32′40″E
- Country: Poland
- Voivodeship: Lower Silesian
- County: Góra
- Gmina: Jemielno

Jemielno [jɛˈmjɛlnɔ] is a village in Góra County, Lower Silesian Voivodeship, in south-western Poland. It is the seat of the administrative district (gmina) called Gmina Jemielno.
