= Leszno Voivodeship =

Former administrative region in Poland

Coordinates: 51°50′38″N 16°34′32″E

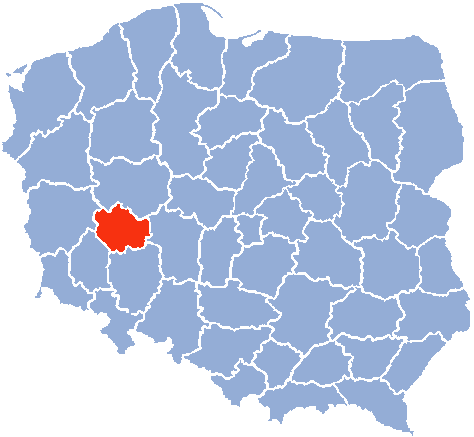
Leszno Voivodeship

Leszno Voivodeship (Polish: województwo leszczyńskie) was a unit of administrative division and local government in Poland from 1975 to 1998, superseded by Greater Poland Voivodeship. Its capital city was Leszno.

== Major cities and towns (population in 1995) ==
- Leszno (61,300)
- Kościan (24,600)
- Rawicz (21,500)
- Gostyń (20,600)

== See also ==
- Voivodeships of Poland
