= Góra County =

Coordinates: 51°40′N 16°33′E

Góra County Powiat górowski
- County
- Coat of arms

- Location within the voivodeship
- Country: Poland
- Voivodeship: Lower Silesian
- Seat: Góra
- Gminas: Total 4: Gmina Góra; Gmina Jemielno; Gmina Niechlów; Gmina Wąsosz

Area
  - Total: 738.11 km^{2} (284.99 sq mi)

Population (2019-06-30)
  - Total: 35,047
  - Density: 47.482/km^{2} (122.98/sq mi)
  - Urban: 14,459
  - Rural: 20,588
- Car plates: DGR
- Website: www.powiatgora.pl

Góra County (Polish: powiat górowski) is a unit of territorial administration and local government (powiat) in Lower Silesian Voivodeship, south-western Poland. It came into being on January 1, 1999, as a result of the Polish local government reforms passed in 1998. The county covers an area of 738.11 square kilometres (285.0 sq mi). Its administrative seat is the town of Góra; the only other town in the county is Wąsosz.

As of 2019 the total population of the county is 35,047, out of which the population of Góra is 11,797, the population of Wąsosz is 2,662, and the rural population is 20,588.

== Neighbouring counties ==
Góra County is bordered by Leszno County to the north, Rawicz County to the east, Trzebnica County to the south-east, Wołów County to the south, Lubin County to the south-west, Głogów County to the west and Wschowa County to the north-west.

== Administrative divisions ==
The county is subdivided into four gminas (two urban-rural and two rural). These are listed in the following table, in descending order of population.

Gmina	Type	Area (km^{2})	Population (2019)	Seat
Gmina Góra	urban-rural	268.7	19,956	Góra
Gmina Wąsosz	urban-rural	193.6	7,161	Wąsosz
Gmina Niechlów	rural	152.0	4,911	Niechlów
Gmina Jemielno	rural	123.8	3,019	Jemielno
