= Bogdanowicz coat of arms =

Polish coat of arms

Bochdanowicz coat of arms

Bochdanowicz is a Polish coat of arms of various noble families in the Galicia region.

On the dial shared are two belt, the upper blue displaying a sun between two silver horseshoes bars, the lower silver belt shows a pitch black horse. There is a jewel in the crown of the helmet. Pelmets blue, with the right gold, silver conquered the left.

The earliest mention of the coat of arms is July 27, 1791 when attributed to Theodore of Rosko-Bogdanowiczowi by Leopold II., He was a merchant living in Szionda rewarded for his supply of the Austrian army. He came from a family of lesser nobility descended from an ancestor was Deoda (Leopold) Bogdanovich. This shield was however an emblem of its own, so its use is restricted to Theodors branch of the clan.
