= Grażyna Chrostowska =

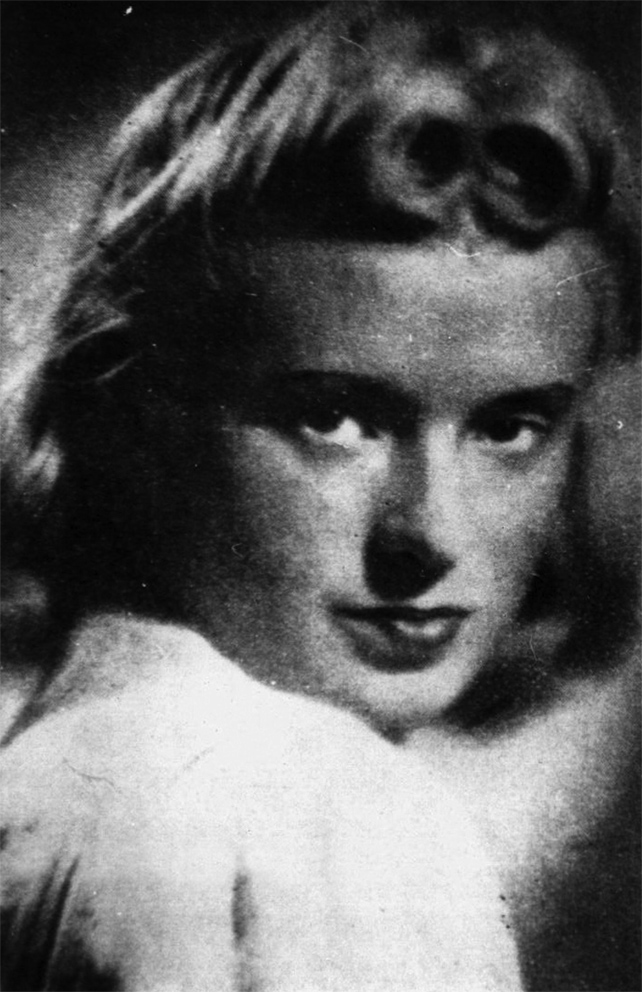
Grażyna Chrostowska

Grażyna Chrostowska (20 September 1921, Lublin - 18 April 1942, Ravensbrück), was a Polish poet and an activist of the Polish underground during the Second World War. She came from Polish nobility (Clan of Ostoja).

She graduated from high school in Lublin. During her school time she wrote poems and showed interests in film and acted in the school's theater. She was also a member of the scouts. After the German occupation of Poland, she was a member of the underground organization Komenda Obrońców Polski. On 8 May 1941 she was arrested along with her father while visiting her sister Apolonia who was already imprisoned. On 23 September 1941 she was deported to the Ravensbrück concentration camp. She was shot by the Nazis together with her sister, Pola (Apolonia), on 18 April 1942.

== Bibliography ==
- Helm, Sarah (2015). If this is a woman : inside Ravensbrück : Hitler's concentration camp for women. London. ISBN 978-1-4087-0538-4. OCLC 900098728.
- I trzeba było żyć... Kobiety w KL Ravensbrück, red. T. Skoczek, wyd. Muzeum Więzienia Pawiak, oddział Muzeum Niepodległości w Warszawie, 2012 Warszawa, s. 8-11.
- T. Krzyżak, Poezja wyrwana z Piekła, [w:] "Rzeczpospolita", 23-24 IX 2007, s. 26-27.
- G. Michalska, Mniej znana siostra, [w:] "PA.RA.", wyd. Ośrodek "Brama Grodzka – Teatr NN", Lublin 2018, nr 11, s. 6.
