= Hanek Chełmski =

Polish courtier, knight and landlord

- Arms of Hanek Chełmski
- Born: c. 1390
- Died: after 1443; Chełm, part of Kraków
- Spouse: Katarzyna (surname unknown)
- Issue: Stanisław Hanek Chełmski

Hanek (Hinek) de Chełm Chełmski, of the Clan of Ostoja (c. 1390 – 1443) was a Polish courtier, knight and great landlord of Chełm, today part of Kraków, owner of Sierosławic, Kantorowic, Gorynic, Kaczkowic, Wierbki, Ziemblic and Przychody. He fought at the Battle of Grunwald in 1410. In year 1413, Hanek Chełmski together with Mikołajem Synowiec de Warzęgow, Jan Gamrat de Klimontowa and Piotrem de Łąkoszyn, gave a deposit guarantees in 4000 silver Kraków grzywna to Jan Farurej de Garbowo, son of Zawisza Czarny for his uncle's manors.

According to Jan Długosz, Hanek was trusted man of King Jogaila and was on the mission to spot Teutonic Knights before the Battle of Grunwald. He was also part of Clan Ostoja that was in the very center of the diplomatic negotiations before the Battle. From his line, Chełmski gave new line in the property of Poniec and then surname Poniecki. According to the sources, Hanek was part of the family that used title comes.

== See also ==
- Clan Ostoja
- Ostoja Coat of Arms
- Stibor of Stiboricz
- Jan de Jani
- Polish heraldry
