= Arciszewski =

Ostoja coat of arms, used by some of Arciszewski family

Arciszewski (female: Arciszewska) is a Polish toponymic surname. Notable people with the surname include:

- Dorota Arciszewska-Mielewczyk (born 1968), Polish politician
- Krzysztof Arciszewski (1592–1656), Polish–Lithuanian nobleman, military officer, engineer, and ethnographer
- Tomasz Arciszewski (1877–1955), Polish socialist politician
