= Abramowicz =

Abramowicz, Abramovich, Abramowitz, and Abramovitz are variant spellings of a name meaning "son of Abraham" among Slavic language speaking peoples; it is a common surname among Ashkenazi Jews, for whom it is commonly Hebraized to Ben-Avraham (בן-אברהם) upon immigration to Israel.

A similar surname of peoples from the former Yugoslavia is Abramović.

Some people with these names include:

Abramowicz (Polish)

- Andrzej Abramowicz (died 1763), Polish-Lithuanian nobleman
- Danny Abramowicz (born 1945), American football player
- Daria Abramowicz (born 1987), Polish sports psychologist
- Dawid Abramowicz (born 1991), Polish footballer
- Kazimierz Abramowicz (1889–1936), Polish mathematician
- Leo Abramowicz (1889–1978), Jewish Austrian painter
- Manuel Abramowicz (born 1967), Belgian reporter
- Michel Abramowicz (born 1950), French cinematographer
- Sławomir Abramowicz (born 2004), Polish footballer
- Tomasz Abramowicz (born 1979), Polish footballer
- Witold Abramowicz, Polish scientist, academic
- Yehuda Meir Abramowicz (1914–2007), Israeli rabbi and politician

Abramovich (Russian: Абрамо́вич)

- Alexander Abramovich (Alexander "Sasha" Argov; 1914–95), Russian-born Israeli composer
- Freddy Nieuchowicz Abramovich (born 1968), Uruguayan radio and television presenter.
- Genrikh Abramovich (1911–1995), Polish-born Soviet scientist
- Luis Abramovich (born 1962), Argentine footballer
- Mario Abramovich (1926–2014), Argentine musician
- Roman Abramovich (born 1966), Russian billionaire businessman, former owner of Chelsea FC
- Vsevolod Abramovich (1890–1913), Russian aviator
- Yuri Abramovich (1935–2017), Soviet aircraft pilot and 'Hero of Russia'

Abramovitch

- Raphael Abramovitch (1880–1963), Russian socialist

Abramovitz

- Carrie Abramovitz (1913–1999), American sculptor, painter, economist
- Max Abramovitz (1908–2004), American architect
- Moses Abramovitz (1912–2000), American economist and professor
- Orit Abramovitz, Israeli Olympic athlete
- S. Y. Abramovitz a.k.a. Mendele Mocher Sforim (1836–1917), Jewish author from Belarus

Abramowitz

- Chaim Zanvl Abramowitz (1902–1995), American Hasidic rebbe
- Dov Ber Abramowitz (1860–1926), American Rabbi
- Milton Abramowitz (1915–1958), American mathematician
- Morton I. Abramowitz (1933–2024), American diplomat and U.S. State Department official
- Pinchas Abramowitz (1909–1986), Israeli artist
- Sid Abramowitz (born 1960), American football player
- Yosef Abramowitz (born 1964), Israeli businessman
