= Ludwik Abramowicz =

Ludwik Abramowicz is the name of:

- Ludwik Abramowicz (1888–1966), Polish/Lithuanian teacher
- Ludwik Abramowicz (1879–1939), krajowcy activist, essayist, newspaper editor

== See also ==
- Abramowicz (surname)
