= Stanisław Lorentz =

Polish scholar of museology

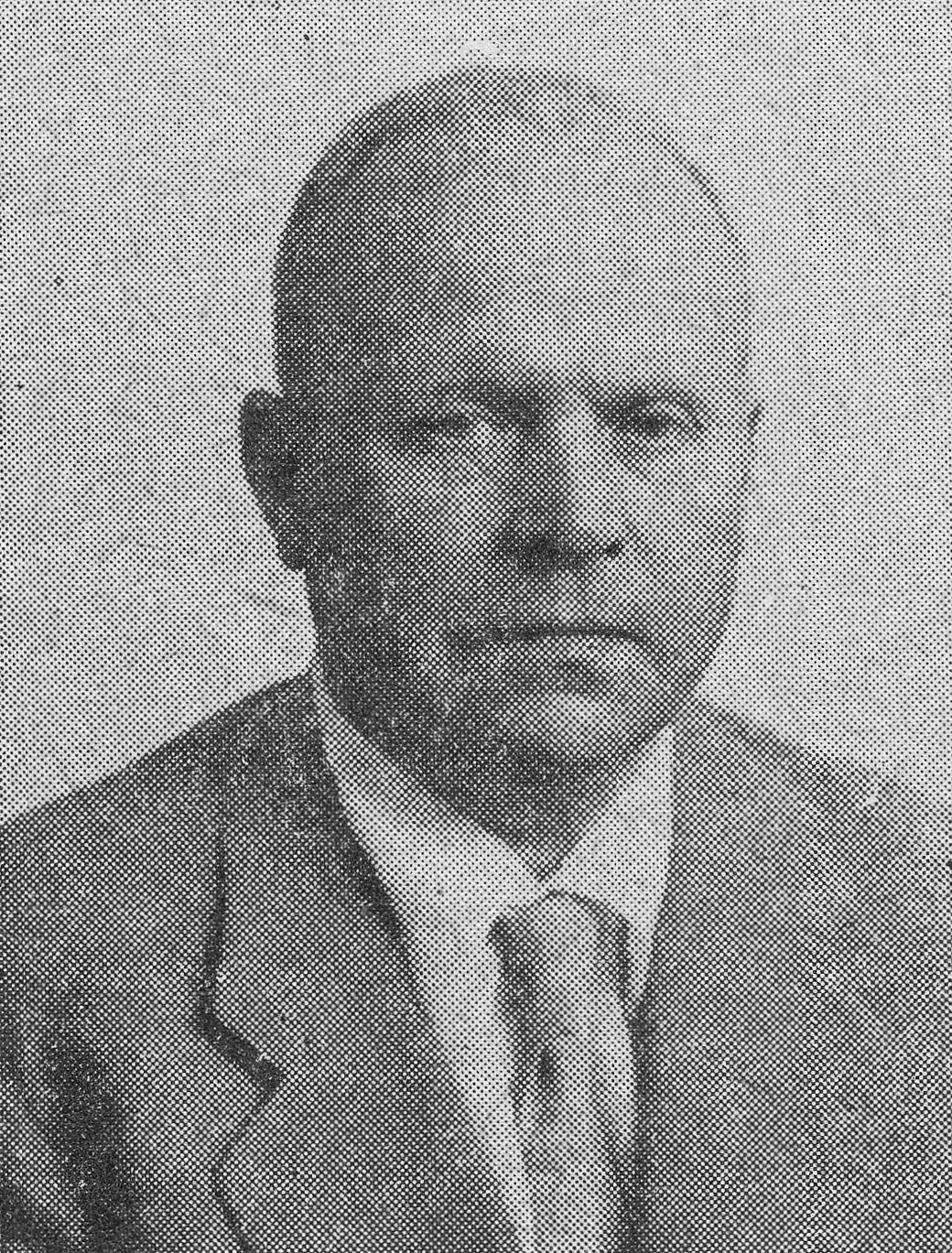
- Portrait of Lorentz, c.1978
- Born: 29 April 1899; Radom, Radom Governorate, Congress Poland
- Died: 15 March 1991 (aged 91); Warsaw, Warsaw Voivodeship, Third Republic of Poland
- Resting place: Evangelical Augsburg Cemetery
- Political party: Alliance of Democrats
- Other political affiliations: Democratic Club; Solidarity
- Awards: Order of the Builders of People's Poland

Academic background
- Education: University of Warsaw
- Thesis: (1924)

Academic work
- Discipline: Philosophy and History of Art
- Institutions: University of Warsaw; Polish Academy of Arts and Sciences; Polish Academy of Sciences

Stanisław Lorentz (28 April 1899 – 15 March 1991) was a Polish scholar of museology and history of art. He was director of the National Museum in Warsaw in the years 1935-1985, deputy to Sejm - the Polish Parliament (1965–69), and an UNESCO expert for the protection of monuments and historic sites.

== Life ==
Born in Radom, Lorentz moved to Warsaw where he studied Philosophy and History of Art at Warsaw University. In 1924 he defended his doctoral thesis (a monograph on Efraim Szreger - Warsaw architect of the Polish Enlightenment). He moved to Wilno (then located in Poland) in 1929, where he worked as the Art conservation officer in the region of Wilno (i.e. protection of the ruins of Trakai Island Castle in Troki) and Nowogródek, as well as lecturing at the Stephen Báthory University in Wilno. From 1935 he was director of the National Museum in Warsaw. With the title of "Polish head of the museum under the German commissioner", he remained engaged at the National Museum.

He was a high-ranking member of the Polish Underground State during the German occupation of Poland, tasked with preserving Polish cultural heritage. After the war in 1945, he resumed his post as the director of the National Museum in Warsaw and was also appointed the Chief Director of Museums and Monuments Protection (Naczelny Dyrektor Muzeów i Ochrony Zabytków). In 1947, Lorentz oversaw the launch of the country's first postwar touring exhibitions program, through which works from the museum's collection by artists such as Jan Matejko were shown outside of Poland's major urban centers.

In 1947 he became a professor at the University of Warsaw, in 1949 a member of Polish Academy of Learning, and in 1952, the Polish Academy of Sciences. In 1982 he was dismissed as a director because of joining Solidarity. He became an honorary director from 1990 until his death in 1991. He was a member of several governmental departments and commissions related to art conservation and was also a deputy to Polish Sejm (1965–1969). He was a UNESCO expert on Polish and international cultural heritage, highly active in the restoration of the Royal Castle, Warsaw and Old Havana, Cuba.

Lorentz conducted an intensive correspondence with Lithuanian art conservation specialist Vladas Drėma. The letters were published in 1998.
