= Ludwik Abramowicz (1879–1939) =

Polish activist

- Born: 5 July 1879; Moscow, Russian Empire
- Died: 3 March 1939 (aged 59); Wilno, Poland
- Occupations: Editor, writer
- Known for: krajowcy

Ludwik Abramowicz-Niepokójczycki (5 July 1879 – 3 March 1939) was a Polish activist, bibliophile, publicist and editor. He was one of the major activists of the krajowcy faction, living in Wilno (now Vilnius, Lithuania). He was an editor of Polish language newspaper Przegląd Wileński (Wilno Review, 1912–1913, 1921–1939).

The newspaper Przegląd Wileński promoted krajowcy. Ludwik Abramowicz was an advocate of preserving all the lands of the former Grand Duchy of Lithuania as a single political entity, without the domination of any of the nationalities inhabiting it, above all Lithuanians, Poles, and Belarusians, but with equal rights to develop their own culture. After Abramowicz returned to Wilno in 1919, he actively promoted the idea that Vilnius Region should be transferred to Lithuania without tying Lithuania to union with Poland, although he suggested a cultural autonomy for Poles. The issues of this newspaper were confiscated many times by the Polish authorities.

Abramowicz held active correspondence with Jonas Šliūpas and other Lithuanian activists. He delivered a speech at Jonas Basanavičius' funeral.

== Biography ==
=== Early life ===
Ludwik Abramowicz was born on July 5, 1879 in Moscow, Russian Empire into a family of a lawyer and was the third son after the eldest Marian and Witold. His parents, Jan and Maria née Mroczkowska, maintained ties with relatives from the Belarusian provinces.

After graduating from high school, presumably in Minsk, Ludwik Abramowicz entered Moscow University, but did not study there for long and continued his studies at Kharkov University, from where he left for France. There his journalistic and public activities began.

At the beginning of the 20th century, he moved to Galicia. He studied at the history faculty of the Jagiellonian University and at the same time continued his activities as a publicist. At this time, Abramowicz joined the Polish movement and maintained contacts with Polish military organizations (Polish Rifle Squads and Riflemen's Association) in Galicia.

In 1904, he arrived in Vilnius and joined the Autonomists Club (Klub Autonomistów), which included representatives of that part of the local Polish, Lithuanian, and Belarusian society who were united by the idea of autonomy for the lands of the former Grand Duchy of Lithuania.

=== Prewar activity ===
In Vilnius Ludwik Abramowicz met Michał Pius Römer, the future leader of the krajowcy regional idea in its democratic form. Römer soon embarked on a publishing venture, founding a liberal-democratic daily. Abramowicz offered his services to the newly established editorial board, and on February 28, 1906, the first issue of Gazeta Wileńska appeared. The paper quickly became a platform for the liberal-democratic circles of Belarus and Lithuania, with Abramowicz emerging as one of its leading publicists. Römer later recalled: "Ludwik turned out to be a good journalist, one of the best in the newspapers. His feuilletons, which he wrote under the pseudonym Licz, were especially good."

The newspaper's primary mission was to promote the coexistence of diverse national and cultural communities on the basis of a shared regional citizenship. Abramowicz became a fervent advocate of krajowcy idea, engaging actively in debates where the principles of the idea were refined and practical steps for its realization discussed. Yet Gazeta Wileńska survived only six months, financial difficulties forced its closure in July 1906.

In the summer of 1906, when Romer and colleagues were trying to revive the newspaper, Ludwik Abramowicz signed a contract with the editorial office of the most popular daily newspaper in the region, Kurier Litewski (Lithuanian Courier). The editor and famous poet and publicist Czesław Jankowski invited him to collaborate in the newspaper. Kurier Litewski also articulated the krajowcy position, though in a more conservative form. Abramowicz soon became one of the newspaper's leading publicists and was assigned to cover the sessions of the State Duma, where the so-called Lithuanian Poles, regional deputies from Belarus and Lithuania, played a notably active role.

In the first half of 1911, under the influence of the activation of Great-Russian chauvinists, the rapprochement of Vilnius' conservative local residents with local supporters of the Party of National Democracy began. In June, the newspaper, which was already published under the name Kurier Wileński, merged with the national-democrat publication Goniec Codzienny. Abramowicz did not agree with this and left the editorial board.

In November 1911, Ludwik Abramowicz, together with Michał Römer, founded another regional publication — the weekly Przegląd Wileński (Vilnius Review, 1911–1915). Abramowicz headed the editorial board. In the very first issue he declared his intention to carry on the traditions of Gazeta Wileńska, promising that Przegląd Wileński "will be based on the Kraj citizenship, recognising the Lithuanian-Belarusian Lands as a separate country, united by common interests, constituting a territorial entity and inhabited by nationalities that have equal rights to decide about themselves and the future of the country".

Przegląd Wileński devoted most attention to national questions, particularly the Lithuanian National Revival and the Polish–Lithuanian conflict. Like Römer, Abramowicz believed that processes of democratization would foster understanding between Poles and Lithuanians. The editorial staff also addressed the "Jewish question," consistently protesting against antisemitism in all its forms. While generally sympathetic toward the Belarusian nationalist movement, the paper devoted considerably less space to its concerns.

At this stage, Abramowicz conceived of regional society as a kind of confederation of independent and equal national communities, each entitled to its own cultural and national development. For him, krajowcy idea was both a framework for the coexistence of the peoples of historical Lithuania, grounded in interethnic and interconfessional tolerance, and a means of preserving the territorial unity of the Belarusian-Lithuanian lands. Within this coexistence, he was especially concerned with safeguarding the Polish community's right to cultivate its own culture. Römer, however, perceived in Abramowicz's stance a veiled Polish nationalism and eventually withdrew from the editorial board.

Abramowicz soon emerged as the principal opponent of the Belarusian krajowcy. In a series of articles in Przegląd Wileński, he sharply criticized the positions advanced by the editorial teams of Kurier Krajowy and Вечерняя газета (published by Anton and Ivan Luckievič) on the question of the Lithuanian Poles, defending their right to develop Polish culture. Abramowicz argued that the krajowcy ideal lay not in subordinating Polishness to the Lithuanian or Belarusian movements, but in securing equality and harmony among them. The Belarusian krajowcy, however, interpreted his stance as a continuation of Polish cultural dominance and Polonization. At times, tensions ran high, with mutual accusations of nationalism on both sides.

=== World War I (1914–1918) ===
Abramowicz left Przegląd Wileński in February 1914. The paper noted his departure only briefly, reporting that he was moving to the "broader Warsaw arena." Financial difficulties, which had plagued him throughout his work on the weekly, ultimately forced him to resign. Early that year he settled in Warsaw, where he continued his journalistic activity and became involved with circles advocating Polish independence.

In Warsaw, he briefly headed the newspaper Strażnica (Watchtower), but censorship intervened after only two issues. Both were confiscated, and the paper was subsequently banned. In its first issue, Abramowicz published an article on the Belarusian movement, which also explored the origins of the national idea and its significance for Lithuanian Poles. After the suppression of Strażnica, Abramowicz did not remain idle: on the eve of the First World War, he succeeded Wincenty Rzymowski as editor of the Warsaw daily Prawda (Truth).

During the war, Abramowicz was active in pro-independence circles. He belonged to the clandestine Union of Patriots, co-founded the Association of Independence Organizations, and edited the underground biweekly Wiadomości Wojenne. He even travelled to Vilnius via Vienna and Bucharest to investigate the mood among Lithuanian Poles, and they eventual support for the pro-independence efforts.

He was also among the initiators of the Grand Duchy of Lithuania Circle in Warsaw, where members debated the future of the Grand Duchy and the Kingdom of Poland in the event of a German victory. Abramowicz consistently upheld the principle of the indivisibility of the Belarusian–Lithuanian lands. At the same time, he was active in the League of Polish Statehood, an organization that oriented its independence strategy toward Austria-Hungary. He served as its secretary and edited the revived Strażnica. In this way, he played an active role in the process of restoring Polish statehood. Yet alongside these activities, he remained a proponent of the statehood of Greater Lithuania, envisaging its relations with Poland in the form of a federative union.

In 1917–1918, Abramowicz often appeared as a leading Polish expert on the "Lithuanian question." Eventually, he found himself in the position of a rapporteur on Lithuanian-Belarusian issues at the Provisional Council of State, established by the German and Austro-Hungarian occupation authorities in January 1917 on the territory of the former Congress Poland. He studied the Lithuanian language, contacted figures from various national movements and organizations of Lithuanian Poles, and analyzed German policy. One of the results of this activity was a collection of documents that described the political and national situation in the lands of historical Lithuania during the period of German occupation, as well as the attempts of Lithuanian and Belarusian figures to turn the former Greater Lithuania into a subject of European politics.

In the spring of 1918, Abramowicz traveled to Vilnius, which was still occupied by German troops, as a reporter. Among other things, he collected information about the situation in Minsk. On November 1, 1918, in connection with the planned withdrawal of German troops from the Vilnius region, the Polish Committee created the Committee of Public Safety, with Ludwik Abramowicz as its vice-chairman. The local Polish-speaking community sought a certain self-organization, an important element of which was to be the Self-Defence units.

=== During the turmoil of 1919–1922 ===
After Vilnius was abandoned by the German army and occupied by the Bolsheviks in early 1919, Abramowicz remained in the city, safeguarding the university's buildings and collections that he managed to preserve. When in April 1919, when Vilnius was taken by Polish troops, Abramowicz welcomed the Proclamation to the Inhabitants of the Former Grand Duchy of Lithuania, in which Józef Piłsudski promised that the fate of Lithuania would be decided with respect to the will of all its inhabitants. In July 1919, in a precise note to the leadership of the Civil Administration, Abramowicz, as head of the Wilno district's press department, reported that initially the Belarusian, Lithuanian and Jewish communities treated this address with distrust or irony. However, its practical implementation gradually worsened the attitude towards it and Abramowicz noticed a clear growth of anti-Polish sentiments.

He remained in Wilno even in July 1920, when the city was seized by Bolshevik forces. Somehow, he escaped repression and even assumed responsibility for safeguarding the property of the reconstituted Wilno University. After the city was retaken by the Lithuanian Republic in the summer of 1920, Abramowicz returned to journalism, striving to uphold the traditions of krajowcy writing and seeking to reconcile support for Lithuanian statehood with Polish national interests. In September 1920, Gazeta Krajowa began publication in Vilnius with Abramowicz as editor.

Abramowicz initially welcomed General Żeligowski's Mutiny because he saw in this a chance to revive the krajowcy's ideas through Poland's efforts. So, he continued publishing the newspaper and became involved in the political life of the new state, joining the Provisional Governing Commission together with his brother Witold. At first, he regarded the establishment of Central Lithuania as a prelude to the creation of a larger, cantonal Lithuanian state. However, he soon realized that the emerging quasi-state formation of Central Lithuania was only a cover for Polish power over the disputed territories during its war against Lithuania.

In May 1921, he transferred the ownership and publication of Gazeta Krajowa to Ludwik Chomiński, while he himself turned to the project of reviving Przegląd Wileński, the first issue of which was published in November 1921. A dispute arose between the periodicals Gazeta Krajowa and Przegląd Wileński over the significance and place of the krajowa idea in the realities of the Second Polish Republic, with Gazeta Krajowa representing a more conservative stance. Ultimately, in July 1922, Gazeta Krajowa was sold to a group of local landowners, who used it as the foundation for Słowo, a paper that would later become highly influential. Przegląd Wileński (a small-format biweekly) remained a platform for condemnations of the Polish state policy of national pressure and oppression in the 1920s and 1930s and the newspaper's goal was to objectively and critically cover the most acute problems of life in the Belarusian-Lithuanian lands, while opposing the Polish nationalist press.

=== Interwar ===
Throughout the interwar, Przegląd Wileński remained the principal voice of the krajowcy idea in Poland. The ideological line of the movement was defined by opposition to both Polish and Lithuanian nationalism, and to the suppression of the Lithuanian and Belarusian cultural life in Poland, resistance to religious fanaticism, and the pursuit of a federalist vision, including a cantonal state in the Belarusian-Lithuanian lands with Wilno as its capital. At the same time, Abramowicz's main local opponent was the national democrat newspaper Dziennik Wileński.

The 1930s were particularly difficult for the newspaper. The number of subscribers was decreasing, and the financial problem was becoming more acute. In December 1931, Ludwik Abramowicz was forced to move the editorial office to his own apartment at 21/6 Sierakowska Street. In the mid-1930s, during the rule of the Wilno voivode Ludwik Bociański, the publication was subjected to severe administrative and judicial persecution. Not the least role in this was played by the influence of Przegląd on the national communities of the region. In particular, the authorities drew attention to the editorial office's cooperation with figures of the Belarusian Christian Democracy, the organ of which was the newspaper Bielaruskaja krynica.

In October 1938, due to the illness of the editor, Przegląd Wileński ceased to exist. Its closure caused a great deal of publicity. Even those who fought against Abramowicz's ideas were saddened. Thus, Stanisław Mackiewicz compared the closure of Przegląd to the burial of all the "tutejszy people".

Ludwik Abramowicz died in March 1939.

== Legacy ==
Michał Pius Römer wrote in his diary on the day of Abramowicz's death:

He was a publicist of extraordinary talent, he had a wonderful and sharp pen. Until the end — usque ad finem — he remained faithful to the so-called krajowcy, which was based on the idea of the statehood of Greater Lithuania, which united the lands of ethnographic Lithuania and Lithuanian Rus' with the capital in Vilnius. He had the courage to oppose Polish nationalism and Polish statehood in historical Lithuanian lands. For him, this was all the more difficult, because he was a Pole. But first of all, he was a Vilnius native and a son of Lithuania, not of Poland itself. Ludwik Abramowicz had a temperament, and the loneliness of his own ideological position and the unpopularity of the political opinions he expressed did not frighten him or incline him to retreat, they rather added energy and strengthened resistance. He went through life without taking his eyes off the star of his idea.

== Historical works ==
It was Abramowicz who, at the beginning of the 20th century, reminded readers of the Vilnius press about the personality of Konstanty Kalinowski on the pages of the Gazeta Wileńskiej. It seems that this was the first publication about Kalinowski in the legal Vilnius press (1906). The article was timed to the 42nd anniversary of the death of K. Kalinowski. L. Abramowicz saw in Kalinowski's activities and views the origins of the regional idea in its democratic version.

Of Ludwik Abramowicz's scientific texts, his history of book printing in Vilnius deserves special attention: "Cztery wieki drukarstwa w Wilnie. Zarys historyczny (1525—1925)". It was published in 1925 by the Lux printing house and was intended as an anniversary edition. L. Abramowicz's research was in a certain sense innovative, as it was the first attempt at a scientific essay on the history of book printing in Vilnius.

After the nationalization of the Wroblewski Library in 1926, Abramowicz became one of the leaders of the Library Assistance Society and initiated the creation of the Vilnius Museum of Iconography in its building. He also transferred to the library his own collections, which consisted of historical documents, periodicals, rare editions of Vilnius printing houses, as well as an unfinished manuscript of a study of the bibliography of the Grand Duchy of Lithuania. An important part of L. Abramowicz's collection was the archive of the Przegląd Wileński.

== Family ==
Ludwik Abramowicz came from a noble family bearing the Waga coat of arms. His father, Jan, was a lawyer serving as a prosecutor. His mother, Maria née Mroczkowska, also came from a family of lawyers. In 1904 he married Julia Salmonowicz, daughter of Ludwik and Karolina née Czernicka. Together they had two daughters, Zofia and Hanna.

Zofia, a graduate of Stefan Batory University in Wilno, became a professor of classical philology at the University of Toruń. Hanna, who later graduated from the School of Fine Arts in Wilno, was an employee of the Municipal Museum in Toruń. Her husband, Tadeusz Makowiecki, a historian of literature and art as well as a librarian, made significant contributions to the preservation of the collections of the University of Warsaw.

Ludwik Abramowicz's brothers were Witold, a politician and democratic activist, and Marian, an archivist and socialist activist.

== Bibliography ==
- (in Polish) Maria Nekanda-Trepka, Ludwik Abramowicz-Niepokójczycki - redaktor "Przeglądu Wileńskiego", Nasz Czas 19/2005 (668)
- Smalianchuk, Aliaksandr (2021). "The last citizen of the Grand Duchy of Lithuania: The Editor Ludwik Abramowicz (1879-1939) and the Idea of Krajowość". Sprawy Narodowościowe: Seria nowa. 53.
- Wojtacki, Maciej (2016). "Represje administracyjne wobec "Przeglądu Wileńskiego" Ludwika Abramowicza w latach trzydziestych XX wieku. Przyczynek do polityki prasowej obozu pomajowego" (PDF). Zapiski Historyczne (in Polish). 81 (3).
- Smalianchuk, A. (2022). "Апошні грамадзянін Вялікага Княства Літоўскага, або Уводзіны ў жыццяпіс рэдактара Людвіка Абрамовіча (1879—1939)" [The Last Citizen of the Grand Duchy of Lithuania, or Introduction to the Biography of Editor Ludvik Abramovich (1879—1939)]. Homo Historicus (in Belarusian). Minsk: Zmitser Kolas.
