= Witold Abramowicz =

Witold Abramowicz may refer to:

- Witold Abramowicz (politician) (1874–1940/1941), Lithuanian politician
- Witold Abramowicz (scientist), Polish scientist
