= Abramavičius =

- Lithuanian surname
- m.: Abramavičius
- f.: (unmarried): Abramavičiūtė
- f.: (married): Abramavičienė
- Origin: Abramowicz (Polish), patronymic from Abram, Abraham
- Related names: Abromavičius, also Abramovich, etc.

Abramavičius is a Lithuanian language family name.

They may refer to:

- Liudvikas Abramavičius (1879–1939), Polish-Lithianian cultural activist
- Leonardas Abramavičius (died 1960), Lithuanian chess player
- Agnė Abramavičiūtė, Lithuanian athlete
