= Glasser =

Glasser is a surname. Notable people with the surname include:

- Albert Glasser (1916–1998), American composer of film scores
- Arthur Glasser (1914–2009), American missiologist and missionary
- Bernard Glasser (1924–2014), American film producer and director
- Carrie Abramovitz (1913–1999; born Carrie Glasser), American sculptor, painter, economist
- Dick Glasser (1933–2000), American singer and songwriter
- Harold Glasser (1905–1992), New Deal economist and Soviet spy
- Ira Glasser (born 1938), director of the ACLU
- Isabel Glasser (born 1958), American actress
- Leah Blatt Glasser, American literary critic and scholar
- Mitch Glasser (born 1989), American-Israeli baseball player
- Phillip Glasser (born 1978), American actor
- Ralph Glasser (1916–2002), Scottish psychologist, economist and author
- Roland Glasser (born 1973), British literary translator
- Ronald J. Glasser, American doctor and author
- Susan Glasser (born 1969), American journalist and editor
- William Glasser (1925–2013), American psychiatrist

== See also ==
- Glasser (musician), American musician
- Glasser effect
- Surfboard shaper, one who applies fiberglass to a surfboard blank
