= Marian Filar =

Marian Filar is the name of:

- Marian Filar (pianist), Polish pianist
- Marian Filar (politician), Polish politician
