= Witold Abramowicz (politician) =

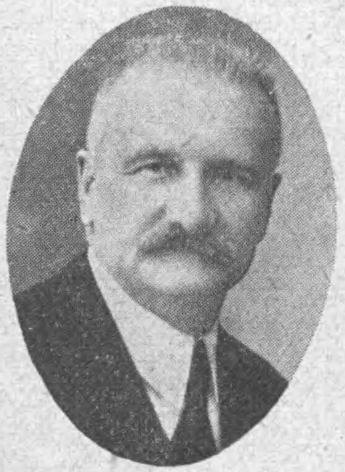
- Abramowicz before 1928.

Member of Senate of Poland
- In office 11 March 1928 – 10 July 1935
- Constituency: Vilnius electoral district

Member of Sejm of Central Lithuania
- In office 1 February 1922 – 1 March 1922

Chairman of the Provisional Governing Commission of Central Lithuania
- In office 12 October 1920 – 16 January 1921
- Preceded by: office established
- Succeeded by: Stefan Mokrzecki

Minister of Internal Affairs of Central Lithuania
- In office 12 October 1920 – 16 January 1921
- Preceded by: office established
- Succeeded by: Stefan Mokrzecki

Mayor of Vilnius
- In office 1919–1919
- Preceded by: Marian Dziewicki
- Succeeded by: Witold Bańkowski

Personal details
- Born: August 28, 1874 Kaluga, Russia
- Died: 1940/1941 Soviet Union
- Party: Polish Socialist Party (1901–1906; 1909–1922; 1922–1927); Polish Socialist Party – Revolutionary Faction (1906–1909); Democratic Party (1922); National People's Party of Lithuanian and Belarusian Lands "Zjednoczenie" (1927); Nonpartisan Bloc for Cooperation with the Government (1928–1935); Democratic Clubs (1938–1939); Alliance of Democrats (1939)
- Spouse: Wanda Budna

Witold Abramowicz (Polish: [ˈvi.tɔlt a.braˈmɔ.vit͡ʂ]; 28 August 1874 – 1940/1941) was a politician and jurist. In 1919, he served as the mayor of Vilnius, Lithuania, and from 12 October 1920 to 16 January 1921, he was the chairperson of the Provisional Governing Commission, an executive government of the Republic of Central Lithuania. In 1922, he was the leader of the Democratic Party, which he represented in the Sejm of Central Lithuania from 1 February to 1 March 1922. From 11 March 1928 to 10 July 1935, he represented the Nonpartisan Bloc for Cooperation with the Government for Vilnius electoral district, in the Senate of Poland.

== Biography ==
Witold Abramowicz was born on 28 August 1874 in Kaluga, Russia. He was son of Jan Abramowicz and Maria Abramowicz (née Mroczkowska). He had graduated philology gymnasium (middle school) in Moscow, and then studied mathematics at the universities in Saint Petersburg and Moscow, and law in Warsaw and Kharkiv, and finished his education in 1898. Following graduating from university, he worked as a legal counsel in the Department of Railways, in, among other places, Vilnius, and Kharkiv. On 16 November 1899, he married Wanda Budna.

In 1901 he became involved in politics, becoming a member of the Polish Socialist Party. In 1906, he became a member of the Revolutionary Faction of the Polish Socialist Party. During the First World War he was a member of the Citizen Guard, a volunteer vigilante paramilitary group that operated from 1914 to 1915 in the Congress Poland. Since 1910s, he was a member of the Freemasonry.

In 1919 he served as the mayor of Vilnius, Lithuania. Following the Żeligowski's Mutiny, and establishments of the Republic of Central Lithuania, Abramowicz was one of the signatories of the "Proclamation to the People of Central Lithuania" signed on 9 October 1920. He became the member, and first chairperson of the Provisional Governing Commission, an executive government of Central Lithuanian, which was established on 12 October 1920. He was also appointed as the Minister of Internal Affairs. He served until 16 January 1921, when he was succeeded in both positions by Stefan Mokrzecki.

In 1922 he was the leader of the Democratic Party, which he represented in the Sejm of Central Lithuania from 1 February to 1 March 1922. He supported the idea of the federation with Poland, proposed by Józef Piłsudski. On 18 April 1922, the Republic of Central Lithuania was incorporated into the Second Polish Republic.

He supported the rights of Lithuanian and Belarusian ethnic minorities in eastern Poland, and was involved in the establishment of the Polish–Belarusian Society in Vilnius in 1924. In 1927 he was a member of the National People's Party of Lithuanian and Belarusian Lands "Zjednoczenie".

From 11 March 1928 to 10 July 1935, he represented the Nonpartisan Bloc for Cooperation with the Government for Vilnius electoral district, in the Senate of Poland. In the 1930s, he criticized the politics of Ludwik Bociański, who served as the voivode of the Vilnius Voivodeship from 1935 to 1939. In 1938, he founded the Vilnius branch of Democratic Clubs, a left-wing anti-fascist political organization. In 1939, he joined the Alliance of Democrats.

Following the Soviet invasion of Poland, Abramowicz was arrested by the People's Commissariat for Internal Affairs, and taken to Siberia, where he died in either 1940 or 1941. The exact date and location of his death remain unknown.

== Awards and decorations ==
- Commander's Cross of the Order of Polonia Restituta (2 May 1923)
- Cross of Independence (19 December 1933)
