= EPO (publisher) =

Belgian publishing company

EPO (Proletarian Education, French: Education prolétarienne, Dutch: Proletarische Opvoeding) is a Belgian publisher of mainly nonfiction. Founded in 1978, it publishes approximately 25 books a year in Dutch and French, mainly centered on politics, history and sociology. These books tend to be of progressive nature. The publisher is closely linked to the Workers' Party of Belgium.

Belgian and international authors who were published by EPO include Manuel Abramowicz, Jan Blommaert, André van Bosbeke, Krista Bracke, Lucas Catherine, Noam Chomsky, Hans Depraetere, Jenny Dierickx, Eduardo Galeano, Ivo Hermans, Peter Tom Jones, Els Keytsman, Jaap Kruithof, Ludo Martens, Michael Parenti, Marc Spruyt, Paul Van Nevel, Robert Van Yper, Peter Vermeulen, Jan Willems, and Howard Zinn.
