= Klimek =

Klimek is a Czech, Polish, Slovak and Sorbian surname. Notable people with the surname include:

- Alf Klimek (born 1956), Australian musician
- Antonín Klimek (1937–2005), Czech historian
- Arkadiusz Klimek (born 1975), Polish footballer
- István Klimek (1913–1988), Hungarian-Romanian footballer
- Jan Klimek (born 1953), Polish politician
- Jayney Klimek (born 1962), Australian singer
- Johnny Klimek (born 1962), Australian film composer
- Lukáš Klimek (born 1986), Czech ice hockey player
- Lylian Klimek (born 1942), Canadian artist and educator
- Małgorzata Klimek (born 1957), Polish mathematician
- Mieczysław Klimek (1913–1955), Polish engineer, professor and rector
- Octavio Klimek Alcaraz (born 1962), Mexican politician
- Sabine Klimek (born 1991), Romanian handballer
- Teresa Klimek (1929–2013), Polish educator and activist
- Thomas Klimek (born 1977), Danish politician
- Tillie Klimek (1876–1936), Polish-born American serial killer
- Tony Klimek (1925–2012), American football defensive end player

== See also ==
- Klimeck
- Klimmek
