= Abromavičius =

- Lithuanian surname
- m.: Abromavičius
- f.: (unmarried): Abromavičiūtė
- f.: (married): Abromavičienė
- Origin: patronymic from Abromas, Abraham
- Related names: Abramavičius, also Abramowicz, Abramovich, etc.

Abromavičius is a Lithuanian language surname. Notable people with the surname include:

- Aivaras Abromavičius (born 1976), Ukrainian Minister of Economy and Trade
- Aleksas Abromavičius (born 1984), Lithuanian discus thrower
- Kazys Abromavičius (1928–2008), Lithuanian painter
