= Jaap Kruithof =

Belgian philosopher and writer

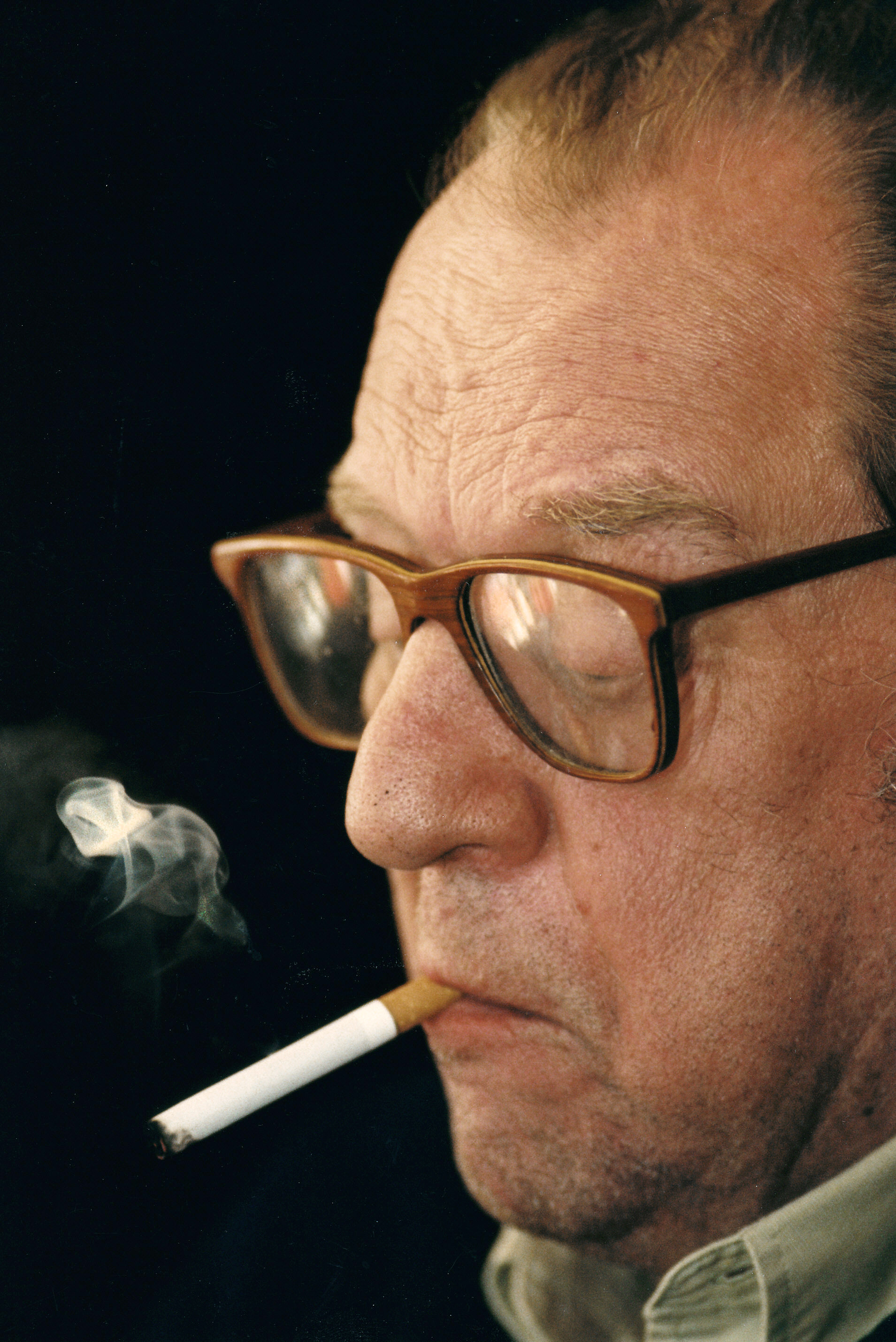
Jaap Kruithof (circa 2001)

Jaap Kruithof (Berchem, 13 December 1929 - Boechout, 25 February 2009) was a Belgian philosopher and writer. His parents were Dutch Protestants. He took degrees in history, law and philosophy in Ghent, and in Paris. Then he earned a Ph.D. on Hegel's ontology, with honours. Since the 1960s he was, along with Etienne Vermeersch and Leo Apostel, one of the icons of the Ghent University and the Flemish intelligentsia in general. He was also a musician (organist) and taught the sociology of music at the Royal Music Conservatory in Antwerp.

Throughout his life, Kruithof was an unflinching debunker of capitalism; ideologically, he sympathised with revolutionary socialism, humanitarian movements and ecocentrism.

== Publications ==
- Het uitgangspunt van Hegels ontologie (1958)
- Jeugd voor de muur (1962) (samen met Jos Van Ussel)
- De zingever (Boom, Meppel 1968)
- Op weg naar een Nobelprijs (De Clauwaert, 1973)
- Eticologie (Boom, Meppel 1973)
- Vrijheid en vervreemding : kritische opstellen over etiek en sociale wetenschappen (EPO, 1984)
- Arbeid en lust I en II (EPO, 1984 en 1986)
- De mens aan de grens (EPO, 1985)
- Omgaan met de dingen : over het gedrag van de moderne westerling (Dedalus, 1991)
- Ingaan op de dingen : over het gedrag van de moderne westerling (Dedalus, 1992)
- Doorgaan met de dingen : over het gedrag van de moderne westerling (Dedalus, 1994)
- Een wereld zonder stuurman : gesprekken 1962-1995 (Nijgh en Van Ditmar, 1995)
- Geen dier jankt zo ongenadig als de mens (Hadewijch, 1997)
- Het neoliberalisme (EPO, 2000)
- Het humanisme (EPO, 2001)
