= Democratic Party (Central Lithuania) =

Democratic Party Stronnictwo Demokratyczne
- Leader: Witold Abramowicz
- Dissolved: 1922
- Headquarters: Vilnius

The Democratic Party (Polish: Stronnictwo Demokratyczne, Lithuanian: Demokratų partija) was a left-wing political party in the Republic of Central Lithuania.

== History ==
Following the 1922 general elections, it held 4 seats in the Sejm of Central Lithuania. It supported independence of the Sejm from outside influence, and demanded that it should held control over the state administration until the possible future unification with Poland. It believed that the idea of the federation with Poland, proposed by Józef Piłsudski, was impossible to organize at that time, and would have to be postponed for the future. Its leader was Witold Abramowicz.
