= Vladas Drėma =

Lithuanian art historian (1910–1995)

- Born: December 3, 1910; Riga, Governorate of Livonia, Russian Empire
- Died: January 4, 1995 (aged 84); Vilnius, Vilnius County, Lithuania
- Awards: Lithuanian National Prize for Culture and Arts

Vladas Drėma (3 December 1910 Riga – 4 January 1995 Vilnius, Lithuania) was one of the most prominent Lithuanian art historians, critics, and art conservation specialists. He is also a known artist. One of the most remembered publications of Vladas Drėma's is Dingęs Vilnius (Lost Vilnius, published in 1991).

== Biography ==
In 1926–1931 Drėma attended an art studio run by Vytautas Kairiūkštis. After graduating from the Stefan Batory University in 1936, Drėma continued his studies in Warsaw. From 1932 he lectured in various schools. He founded Vilnius group, that involved Lithuanian, Polish and Jewish artists. At first Drėma's works were influenced by cubism and constructivism.

In 1945 he was invited to become director of Ethnography Museum. Drėma held this position until 1946. He lectured in Vilnius University until 1948 and in Lithuanian Art Institute until 1970. In 1992 Drėma was awarded an honorary degree of Vilnius Academy of Fine Arts. He maintained active and long-term correspondence with Stanisław Lorentz about Vilnius art history, and heritage, that was published in 1998.

== Notable publications ==
- Pranciškus Smuglevičius. Vaga, 1976
- Dingęs Vilnius. Vaga, 1991. ISBN 5-415-00366-5
- Vilniaus Šv. Jono bažnyčia. R. Pakalnio leidykla, 1997. ISBN 9986-830-00-1
- LDK miestai ir miesteliai (posthumously). Versus aureus, 2006. ISBN 9955-699-46-9
- Kanutas Ruseckas. — Vilnius: Vilniaus dailės akademijos leidykla, 1996. — 287 с. — ISBN 9986-571-18-9 (лит.)
