= Democratic Clubs =

Former 1930s political organization in Poland

Democratic Clubs Kluby Demokratyczne
- Founded: September 1937
- Dissolved: 15 April 1939
- Succeeded by: Alliance of Democrats
- Newspaper: Czarno na Białem (unofficially)
- Ideology: Anti-fascism
- Political position: Left-wing

Democratic Clubs (Polish: Kluby Demokratyczne) was a left-wing and anti-fascist political organization in the Second Polish Republic. It was founded in September 1937 by left-wing and nonpartisan Sanation politicians, in response to the growing fascist movement in Poland. On 15 April 1939, it was reorganised into the Alliance of Democrats. Key members of the organisation included Marceli Handelsman, Mieczysław Michałowicz, Wincenty Rzymowski, and Alfred Fiderkiewicz.

== History ==
Democratic Clubs were founded in September 1937 by left-wing Sanation and nonpartisan politicians. It was proposed by Mikołaj Kwaśniewski, in the opposition to right-wing faction of Sanation politicians forming the Camp of National Unity, and the growing fascist movement in Poland. First branch of Democratic Clubs was founded in Warsaw, with its first meeting taking place on 16 October 1937, in the tenement building at 31 Old Town Market Place. It was later followed by Kraków, Łódź, Lwów, Wilno, Katowice, Sosnowiec, Bielsko, Poznań, Kalisz, and Gdynia. Among its most important members were Marceli Handelsman, Mieczysław Michałowicz, Wincenty Rzymowski, and Alfred Fiderkiewicz. It was unofficially associated with the weekly newspaper Czarno na Białem.

Its political agenda was stated in the Small Democratic Declaration (Polish: Mała deklaracja demokratyczna), ratified on 16 October 1937 in the Warsaw Democratic Club.

On 15 April 1939, Democratic Clubs were united and reorganised into the Alliance of Democrats political party.

The façade of a tenement building at 31 Old Town Market Place in Warsaw, features a plaque commemorating the formation of the Warsaw Democratic Club in 1937.

== Gallery ==
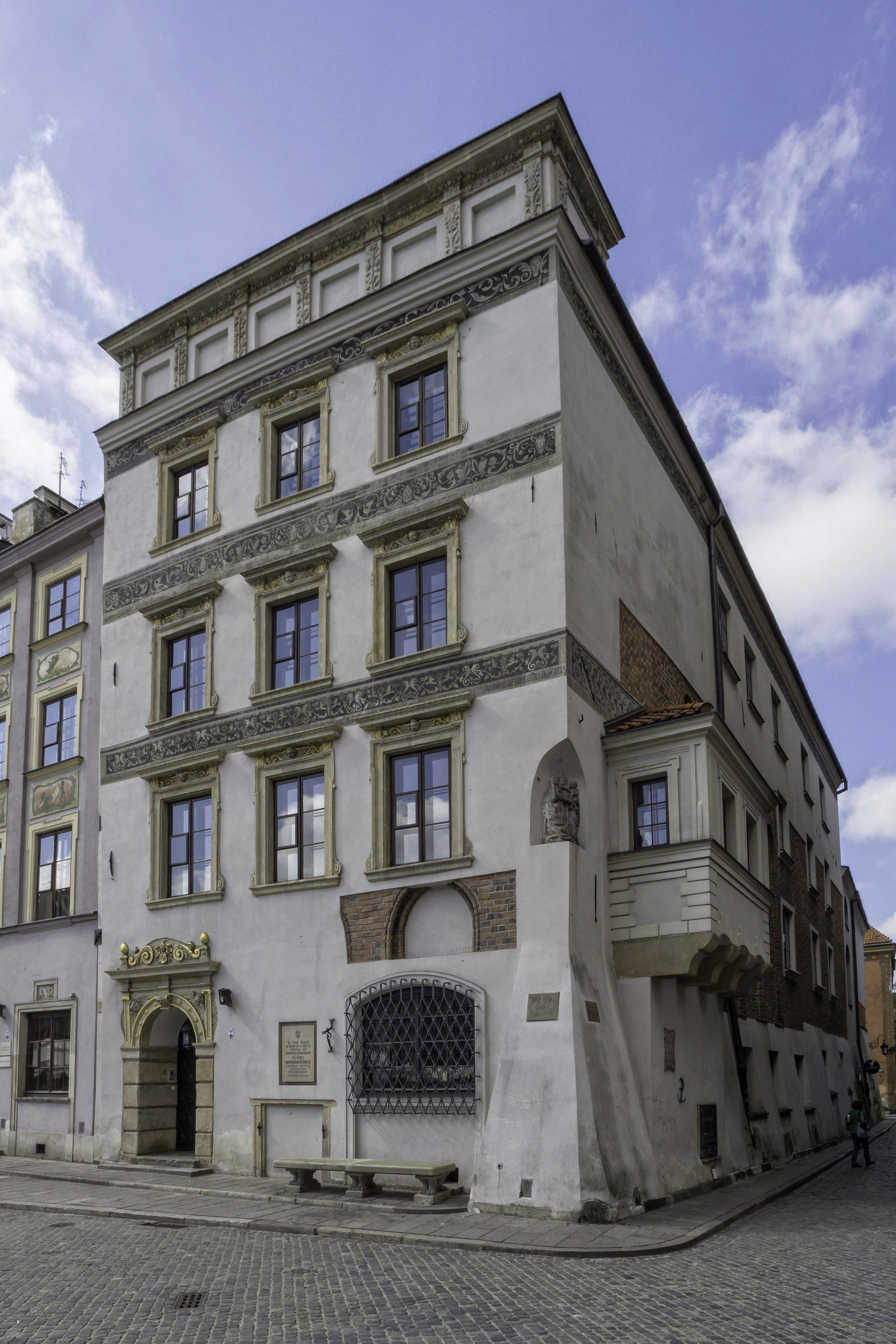
Former headquarters of the Warsaw branch of Democratic Clubs, at 31 Old Town Market Place.

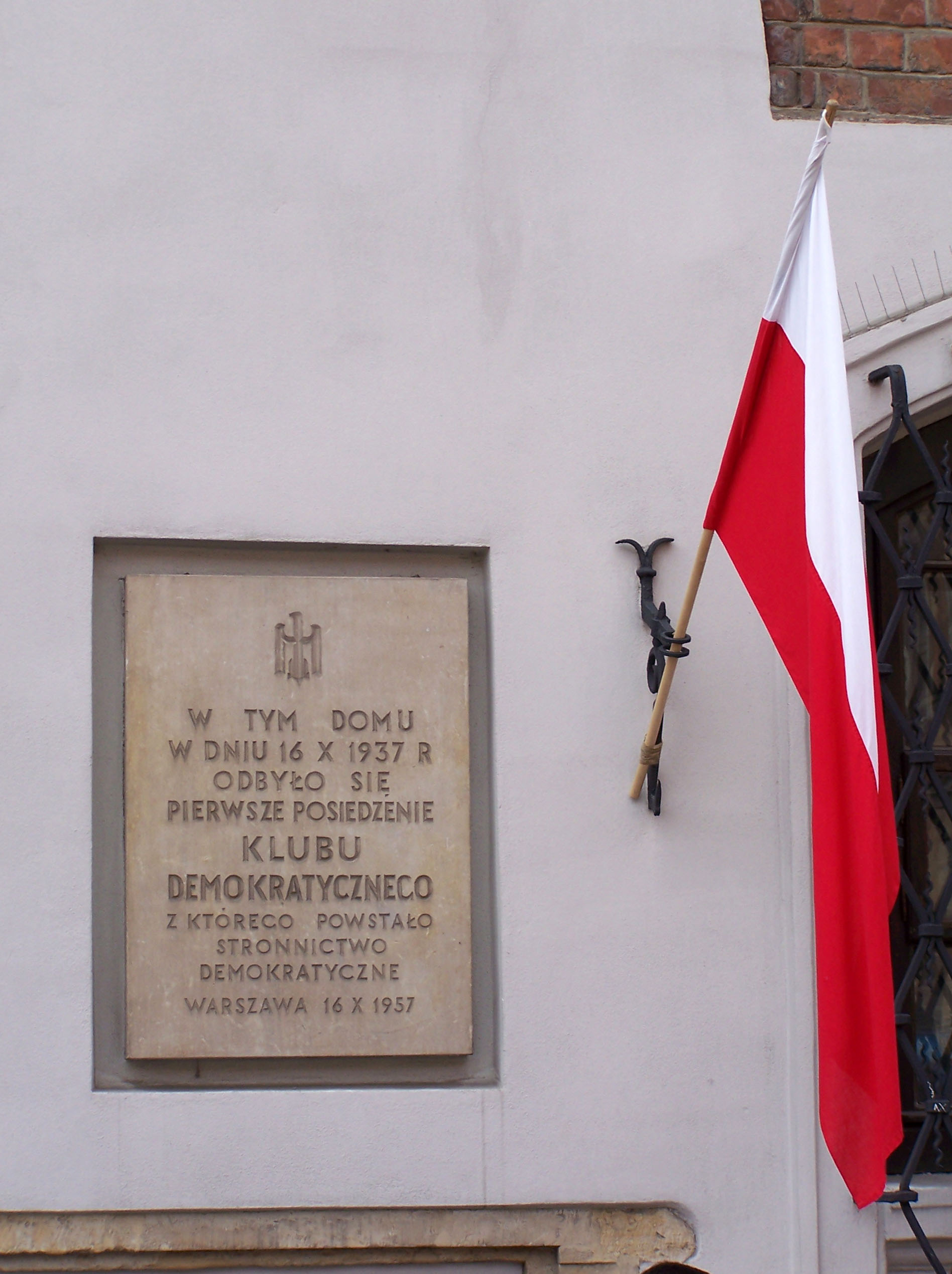
A plaque commemorating the founding location of the Warsaw Democratic Club.
