= Aleksander Meysztowicz =

Polish politician (1864–1943)

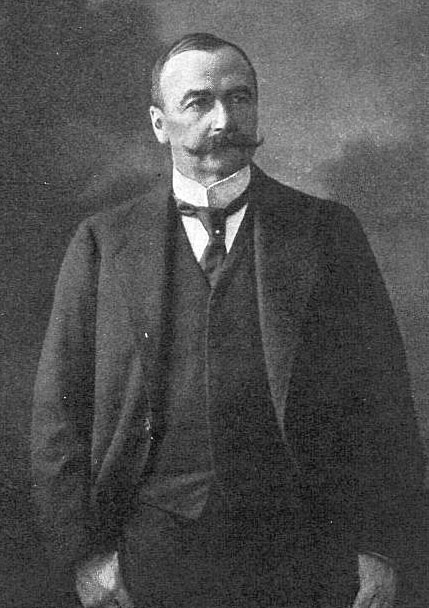
- Meysztowicz in 1915

Minister of Justice of Poland
- In office 2 October 1926 – 22 December 1928
- Preceded by: Wacław Makowski
- Succeeded by: Stanisław Car

Chairperson of the Provisional Governing Commission of Central Lithuania
- In office 21 November 1921 – 6 April 1922
- Preceded by: Stefan Mokrzecki
- Succeeded by: office abolished

Minister of Internal Affairs of Central Lithuania
- In office 21 November 1921 – 6 April 1922
- Preceded by: Stefan Mokrzecki
- Succeeded by: office abolished

Member of the State Council of the Russian Empire
- In office 25 September 1909 – 1 May 1917
- Constituency: Kovno Governorate landowners' curia

Personal details
- Born: 8 December 1864 Pajuostis, Russian Empire (now part of Lithuania)
- Died: 14 February 1943 (aged 78) Rome, Italy
- Party: Centre (1909–1917); Polish National Committee (1914–1917); National Conservative Party (1917–1918)
- Spouse: Zofia Meysztowicz
- Children: Walerian Meysztowicz
- Education: Jagiellonian University

Aleksander Meysztowicz (Polish: [a.lɛkˈsan.dɛr mɛ.ɘ̟ʂˈtɔ.vit͡ʂ]; 8 December 1864 – 14 February 1943) was a Polish politician, landowner, and social activist. He served as the Minister of Justice of Poland from 1926 to 1928, and the chairperson of the Provisional Governing Commission and the Minister of Internal Affairs in the Republic of Central Lithuania from 1921 to 1922. He was also a member of the State Council of the Russian Empire from 1909 to 1917.

== Biography ==
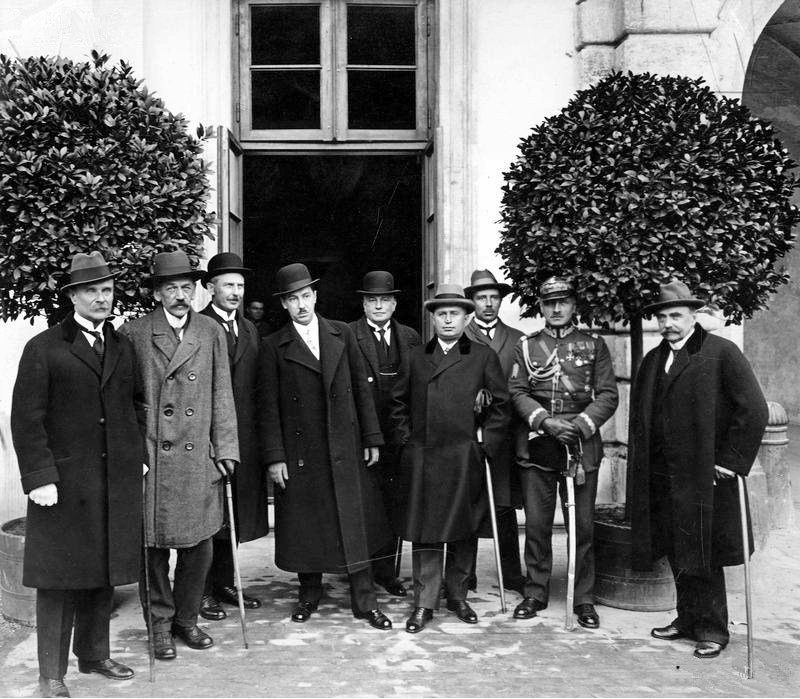
The members of the cabinet of the Prime Minister of Poland, Józef Piłsudski, including Aleksander Meysztowicz, in 1926.

Aleksander Meysztowicz was born on 8 December 1864, in Pajuostis, near Panevėžys, then located within Kovno Governorate in the Russian Empire, and now forming part of Lithuania. He came from Polish landed gentry family, which owned the Pajuostis estate. He studied at the Vilnius Gymnasium, to which at the time also attended Józef Piłsudski, future Chief of State of Poland. Later, he graduated from the Jagiellonian University. Following his graduation, he was enlisted into the Imperial Russian Army and served in the 9th Yelysavethrad Dragoon Regiment. He was discharged in 1891, with the rank of lieutenant, and settled in the Pajuostis estate which he inherited from his parents, and devoted himself to agriculture and social activities.

In 1900, at the founding of the Kaunas Society of Agriculture, Meysztowicz was elected its deputy chairperson, and in 1904, he was unanimously voted to receive the title of its honorary member. Under his leadership, the society handled issues of resettling villages and establishing retirement funds for agricultural workers. From his initiative were also founded the Kaunas Mutual Fire Insurance Society, of which he was also the chairperson, and a number of other agricultural unions which served to unite the activities of rural owners. Because of his participation in the unveiling ceremony of the Monument of Catherine the Great in Vilnius, on 23 September 1904, he was disliked by Polish nationalists.

From 1909 to 1917, Meysztowicz was a member of the State Council of the Russian Empire based in Saint Petersburg, where he belonged to the Centre parliamentary group. He represented the landowners' curia of the Kovno Governorate. Meysztowicz was also a member of the political group Polish National Committee. He was also the chairperson of the Vilnius Land Bank from 1918 to 1926, and from 1932 to 1939.

After returning to Lithuania in 1917, he became a prominent member of the Borderlands Bisons, a conservative group of Lithuanian Poles, who sought to unite Lithuania with Poland. From 1917 to 1918, he was also a prominent member of the National Conservative Party.

After Lithuania has declared independence from Russia in 1918, he fled to Polish-occupied Vilnius, while his estate was confiscated by the government. From 21 November 1921 to 6 April 1922, he served the chairperson of the Provisional Governing Commission of the Republic of Central Lithuania, as well as its Minister of Internal Affairs.

From 2 October 1926 to 22 December 1928, served was the Minister of Justice and the Chief Prosecutor of Poland. He supported Polish expansion to the east, and advocated for the polonisation of the ethnic minorities in eastern Poland.

Since 1933, he was a secret Papal Chamberlain. In 1939, he moved to Rome, Italy where he died on 14 February 1943, at the age of 78. He was buried in the crypt of the Saint Anne Church in Vatican City.

== Personal life ==
He was married to Zofia Meysztowicz (née Korwin-Kossakowska), with whom he had a son, Walerian Meysztowicz, who was a Catholic priest.

== Orders and decorations ==
- Commander's Cross with Star of the Order of Polonia Restituta (2 May 1923)
