= Stefan Mokrzecki =

Polish general

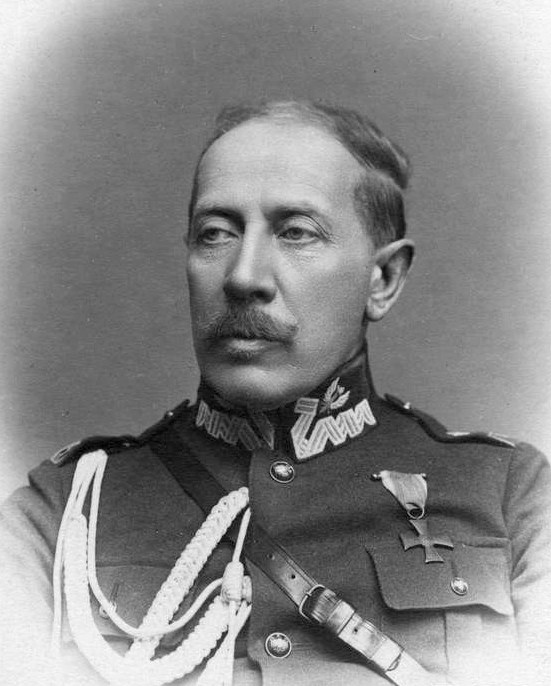
- Maj. Gen. Stefan Mokrzecki

Chairman of the Provisional Governing Commission of Central Lithuania
- In office 16 January 1921 – 21 November 1921
- Preceded by: Witold Abramowicz
- Succeeded by: Aleksander Meysztowicz

Personal details
- Born: 28 April 1862 Dzitryki, Grodno Governorate, Russian Empire
- Died: 9 April 1932 (aged 69) Wilno, Wilno Voivodeship, Second Polish Republic
- Spouse: Joanna Bronisława Zelman
- Children: 4

Stefan Mokrzecki of Ostoja coat of arms (1862–1932) was a general in the Russian Army and the Polish Army. During Polish-Soviet War commanded 8 DP and other units. Later member of armed forces of Republic of Central Lithuania. Retired in 1925. He was brother of Adam Mokrzecki that also was a general in Russian army to end as general of Polish army. He was born in Dzitryki, now in Belarus. Another brother was the entomologist Zygmunt Mokrzecki.

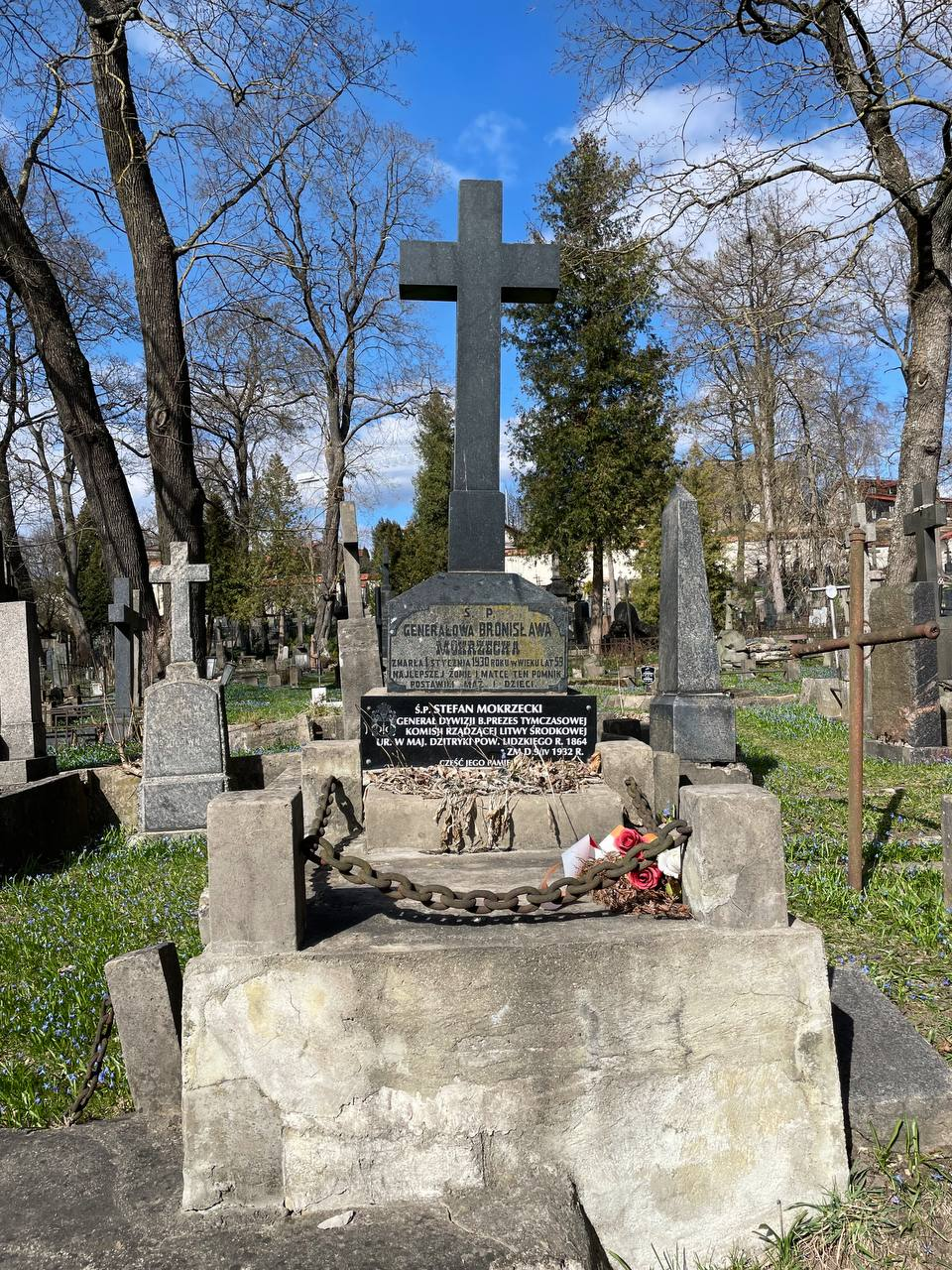
Stefan Mokrzecki's grave at the Bernardine Cemetery in Vilnius

== Recognitions ==
- Krzyż Komandorski Orderu Odrodzenia Polski (2 maja 1923)
- Cross of Valour (Poland) (1921)
- Cross for duties in favour of Lithuanian Army (1926)
- Order of st. George (Russia)|Order św. Jerzego 1914
- Order of Sant Anna, 2nd and 3rd class

== See also ==
- Ostoja coat of arms
- Clan of Ostoja
