= Aleksander Mackiewicz =

Polish economist and politician (1944–2022)

Chairman of the Alliance of Democrats
- In office 28 February 1990 – 14 December 1991
- Preceded by: Jerzy Jóźwiak
- Succeeded by: Zbigniew Adamczyk

Minister of Internal Market
- In office 12 September 1989 – 12 January 1991
- Preceded by: Jerzy Jóźwiak

Personal details
- Born: 6 September 1944 Chemnitz, Saxony, Germany
- Died: 14 June 2022 (aged 77)
- Party: SD
- Education: University of Warsaw
- Occupation: Economist

Aleksander Mackiewicz (6 September 1944 – 14 June 2022) was a Polish politician. A member of the Alliance of Democrats, he served as minister of internal market from 1989.

Mackiewicz died on 14 June 2022 at the age of 77.
