= Abramović =

- Language: Serbo-Croatian

Abramović (Serbian Cyrillic: Абрамовић, pronounced [abrǎːmovitɕ]) is a surname from Bosnia and Herzegovina, Croatia, Montenegro, and Serbia. It is a patronymic derived from the given name Abram. It may refer to:

- Alen Abramović (born 1976), Croatian cross-country skier
- Antonije Abramović (1919–1996), Montenegrin Orthodox Church religious leader
- Boško Abramović (1951–2021), Serbian chess player
- Domagoj Abramović (born 1981), Croatian footballer
- Ivana Abramović (born 1983), Croatian tennis player
- John Abramovic (1919–2000), American basketball player
- Maria Abramović (born 1987), Croatian tennis player
- Marina Abramović (born 1946), Serbian performance artist
