= Mieczysław Michałowicz =

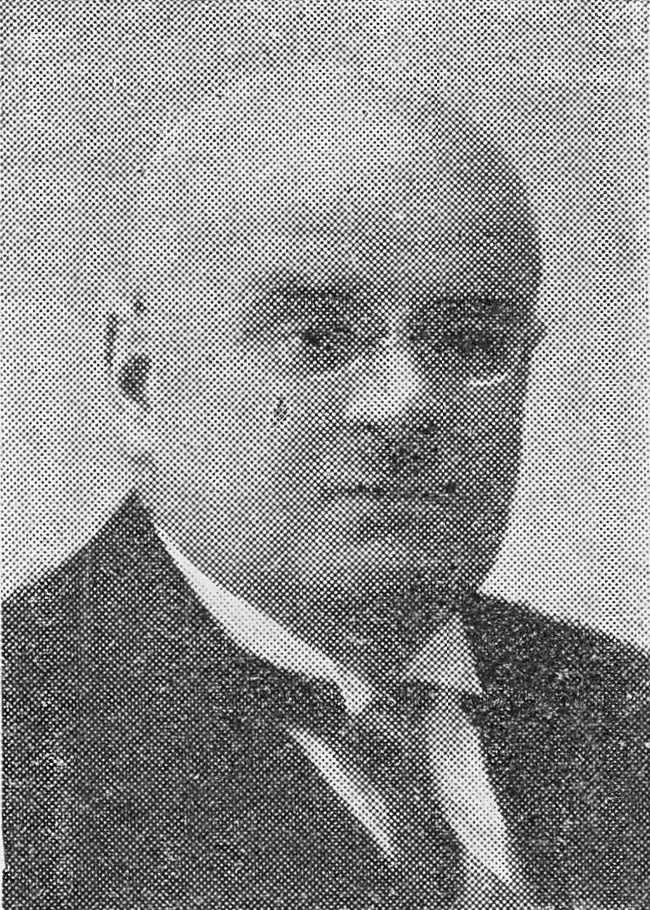
- Born: 10 September 1876; Saint Petersburg, Russia
- Died: 22 December 1965 (aged 89); Warsaw, Poland
- Resting place: Powązki Cemetery, Warsaw, Poland
- Occupations: Pediatrician and professor
- Political party: Democratic

Mieczysław Jan Michałowicz (10 September 1876 – 22 December 1965) was a Polish social and political activist, medical doctor of pediatrics, and professor of the Warsaw University.

== Career ==
Michałowicz was born in Saint Petersburg, Russian Empire. He was an activist of the Polish Socialist Party, a rector of the Warsaw University from 1930 to 1931, and a member of the Polish Academy of Skills and Polish Academy of Sciences. He was a member of the Senate of Poland, first as a supporter of the sanacja regime, but later in opposition to it. He was one of the co-founders of the Democratic Party (Polish: Stronnictwo Demokratyczne). During World War II he was imprisoned by the Germans; after the war decided to collaborate with the Polish communist Soviet-backed regime.
