= Leo Abramowicz =

Jewish Austrian painter

Leon Abramowicz (18 March 1889 – 15 February 1978) was a Jewish Austrian painter who emigrated from Nazi Austria.

== Early life ==
Abramowicz was born into a Jewish family in Czernowitz in Bukovina, Austria-Hungary (now Chernivtsi, Ukraine). His father worked as a butcher. His brother was Serge Abranovic (stage name; died 1942 in Warsaw), celebrated as the "Caruso of operetta". Abramowicz studied painting at the Academy of Fine Arts in Vienna and from 1912 to 1914 at the Royal Academy of Fine Arts in Munich under Karl Raupp and Ludwig von Herterich.

== Career as an artist ==
After serving in the First World War as a soldier in the Austrian army, Abramowicz lived in Switzerland and France and, from the 1920s, in Vienna, where he worked as a freelance painter. From 1933 to 1935, he studied at the Vienna Academy under Karl Sterrer. He then settled in Vienna as a freelance painter and graphic artist. He was soon successful and received commissions from the US, especially for portraits. This enabled him to rent a studio in Vienna's Prinz-Eugen-Straße and buy an apartment for himself and his wife Maria, née Prenosyl (* 1907), at Schottenbastei 16 in Vienna's city center.

== Nazi era confiscations and internment ==
After Anschluss, the annexation of Austria to National Socialist Germany in March 1938, Abramowicz and his wife were persecuted due to anti-Jewish laws in Nazi Austria. Abramowicz fled to France on 24 May 1938, and his wife followed him in January 1939. Their apartment and its entire contents were confiscated in 1938. The inventory of the apartment and studio, including the entire artistic oeuvre since 1918, an estimated 600 oil paintings and 7,000 works on paper, copies after old masters, magnificent original costumes that Abramowicz had used for his works, a small collection of paintings by modern painters and several projection and photographic cameras were confiscated and forcibly sold. Their whereabouts are unknown.

After fleeing, the couple first came to Nice. Abramowicz became friends with the painter Pierre Bonnard, who had a strong artistic influence on him. In 1940, Abramowicz and his wife were taken separately to internment camps. However, with the permission of the prefecture of Grenoble, they were given a refugee apartment as victims of the Nazis. In July 1943, the wife was captured by the Nazis and taken to the Gurs concentration camp. Abramowicz was arrested during a raid in August 1943 and sent to a camp in Toulouse. He and his wife managed to escape and lived underground with the help of a Jewish refugee committee until the liberation of the country.

== Postwar ==
Abramowicz then worked as a freelance painter in Paris. In 1950, he and his wife returned to Vienna, where they lived in seclusion and Abramowicz worked as a painter. Until 1957, he studied again as a guest student in the painting master classes of Josef Dobrowsky and Robin Christian Andersen at the Vienna Academy of Arts.

Stylistically influenced by Bonnard, Paul Cézanne, Oskar Kokoschka and Anton Faistauer, Abramowitz mainly painted still lifes, portraits and landscapes.

== Selected works ==
- Stillleben mit Rosen und Apfel (Öl auf Pappe, 45 × 55 cm, 1922; Museum Kunst der Verlorenen Generation, Salzburg)
- Porträt Maria Abramowicz (Öl auf Karton, 381 × 47,3 cm, um 1948)
- Selbstporträt (Öl auf Leinwand, 100 × 65 cm)
- Blumenstillleben (Öl auf Leinwand, 80 × 60 cm; um 1935/1938)
- Das Künstlerehepaar Abramowicz (Öl auf Leinwand, 63 × 46 cm)
- Blumenstillleben (Öl auf Leinwand, 62,2 × 42,5 cm)

== Literature ==
- Karl Heinz Ritschel: Leon Abramowicz. 1889–1978. Ein Maler aus der „verschollenen Generation“. Winter Verlag, Salzburg, 1980
- Sophie Lillie: Was einmal war. Handbuch der enteigneten Kunstsammlungen Wiens. Czernin Verlag, Wien, 2003, S. 29/39
