= Kazimierz Abramowicz =

Polish mathematician

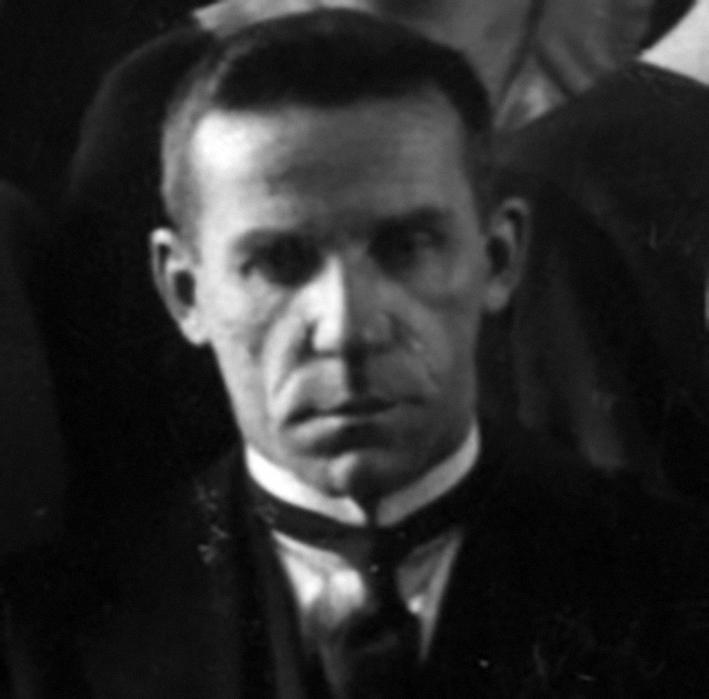
Kazimierz Abramowicz

Kazimierz Abramowicz (1889–1936) was a Polish mathematician and professor at the University of Poznan. He worked in the field of theory of analytic functions, in particular hypergeometric functions.
