= Provisional Governing Commission =

The coat of arms of Central Lithuania.

The Provisional Governing Commission (Note: Polish: Tymczasowa Komisja Rządząca, abbrv.: TKR; Lithuanian: Laikinoji valdymo komisija) was a provisional executive government of the Republic of Central Lithuania, that existed from 1920 to 1922.

== History ==
The Provisional Governing Commission had been formed on 12 October 1920, following Żeligowski's Mutiny, in which forces from Poland, under the command of general Lucjan Żeligowski, had ceased Vilnius Region from Lithuania, and established the Republic of Central Lithuania, as the puppet state of Poland. The formation of the executive government had been announced by Żeligowski, the commander-in-chief of Army of Central Lithuania, who de facto acted as the leader of the state. It included Witold Abramowicz, Leon Bobicki, Mieczysław Engiel, Jerzy Iwanowski, Vacłaŭ Ivanoŭski, Teofil Szopa, and Aleksander Zasztowt. Engiel and Szope represented the Borderlands Guard within the Provisional Governing Commission. On the day of its establishment, Żeligowski had appointed the members of the government to the offices of the ministers. The Provisional Governing Commission formally ceased to exist on 6 April 1922, when the Legislative Sejm of Poland voted for the resolution to incorporate Central Lithuania into Polish territory.

== Structure ==
The Provisional Governing Commission was formed from 11 ministries and the chairperson. The chairperson was simultaneously the head of the Ministry of Internal Affairs, and their responsibilities included: representing the state in international politics, organizing and leading the government meetings, and leading the Chairperson Bureau and the Law and Legislature Department. Their deputy was the vice-chairperson, who deputized the chairperson in their responsibilities connected to running the Provisional Governing Commission.

The competencies of the government included:

- the executive power,
- the supervision of state administration,
- the preparation of the state spending and profits,
- nominating the 3rd- and 4th-class officials,
- issuing the executive ordinances and decrees.

The government had its meetings organized 2 times in a week, with the possibility of organizing additional emergency meetings.

Alongside the Provisional Governing Commission, functioned also the Office of the Chairperson of Provisional Governing Commission, that oversaw the officials employment, and the Chairperson Bureau, which executed the orders from the chairperson.

== List of the chairmen ==
- Witold Abramowicz (12 October 1920 – 16 January 1921)
- Stefan Mokrzecki (16 January 1921 – 21 November 1921)
- Aleksander Meysztowicz (21 November 1921 – 6 April 1922)
