= Genrikh Abramovich =

Soviet scientist (1911 – 1995)

- Генрих Наумович Абрамович
- Born: 1 May 1911; Warsaw, Kingdom of Poland, Russian Empire
- Died: 27 March 1995 (aged 83); Moscow, Russian Federation
- Education: Doctor of Technical Sciences (1939) (professor since 1939), Moscow State University of Civil Engineering
- Occupations: scientist, professor (in the field of aeromechanics)
- Awards: N. E. Zhukovsky award

Genrikh Abramovich (May 1, 1911, Warsaw – March 27, 1995, Moscow) was a Soviet scientist in the field of aeromechanics, theoretical and applied gas dynamics.

== Biography ==
Born on May 1, 1911, in Warsaw in the family of Naum Abramovich, a student at the Warsaw Polytechnic Institute. In his youth, his father became interested in revolutionary activities, was arrested, deported, and was in prison (according to family legend, in the same cell with Gleb Krzhizhanovsky).

He studied at the music school named after Alexander Scriabin (now the Academic Music College at the Moscow Conservatory) in the class of A. V. Alexandrov.

In 1929, he entered the Moscow Higher Technical University at the heat engineering department of the construction faculty.

In 1932, Abramovich was hired by the TsAGI. He mastered the control of the U-2 aircraft and flew on it.

Abramovich conducted practical classes in theoretical mechanics at the Moscow Institute of Engineering and Technology (MISI) (1932), and lectured on industrial aerodynamics (1933). He taught at the Moscow Aviation Institute (1939–1991), professor (1945), head of the department of theory of air-breathing engines (1962–1982); State Tax Service (1991–1995).

In February 1944, he was appointed deputy director of the Institute of Jet Aviation ( NII-1 ), created in connection with the closure of the RNII and the removal of A.G. Kostikov from work on jet technology.

As part of Soviet delegations, he traveled to Germany in the spring of 1945 to select materials in connection with the study and development of German jet technology, and was the leader of a group of NII-1 specialists who were members of the commission of the Ministry of Aviation Industry.

At the beginning of 1945, from NII-1 of the Ministry of Aviation Industry, he was invited to CIAM (part-time) by V.I. Polikovsky to organize research in the field of aerogasdynamics of engines. Abramovich remained the head of the gas dynamics laboratory he had previously organized at NII-1 (until 1952), and at the same time gave a course of lectures on hydrogas dynamics at the Moscow Aviation Institute.

From 1946 to 1951, he was a professor at the Faculty of Physics and Technology of Moscow University.

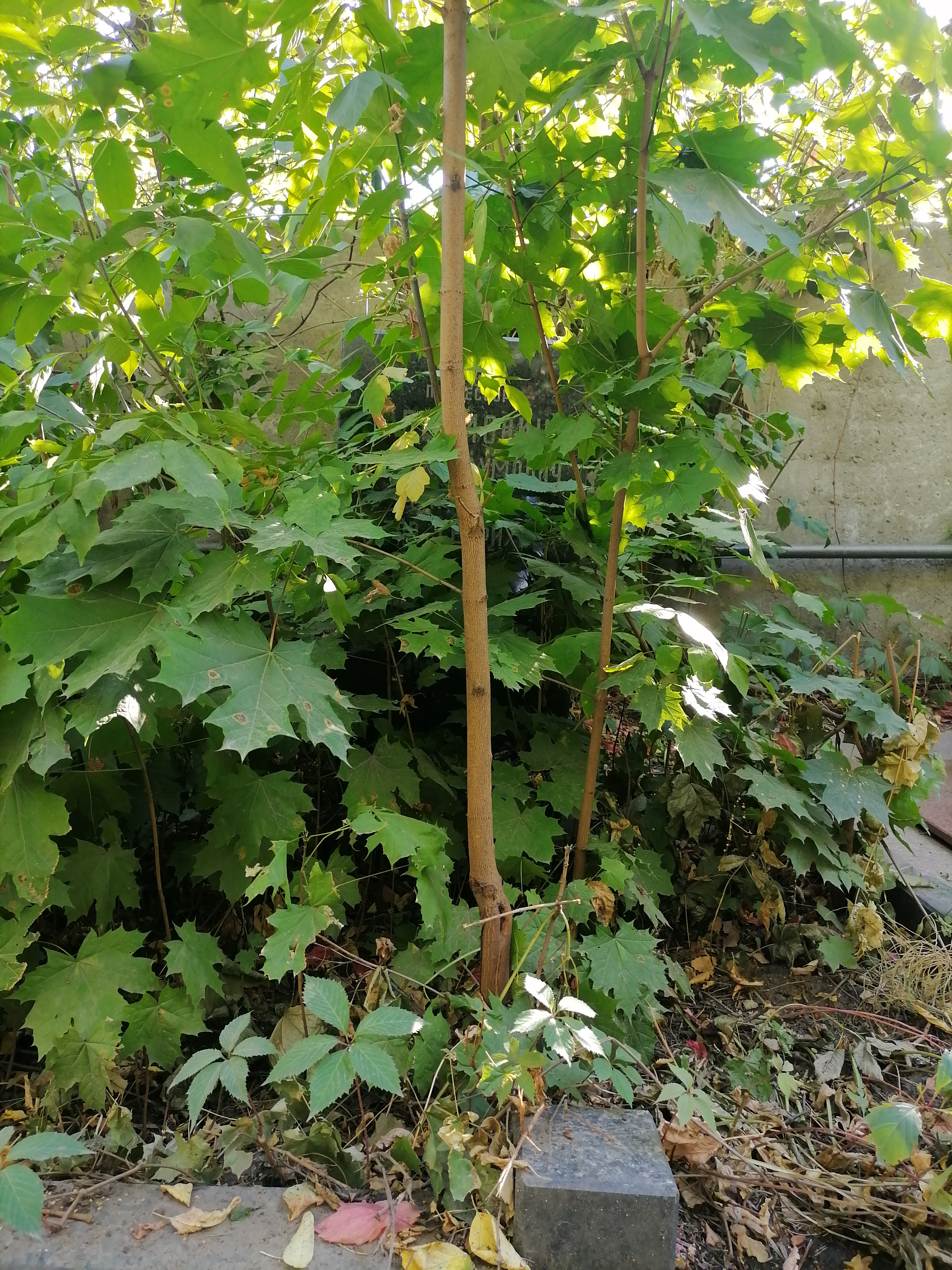
Grave of Abramovich in Moscow

Abramovich died on March 27, 1995. He was buried in Moscow at the Kuntsevo cemetery.

== Bibliography ==
- Gas dynamics of air-jet engines [Газовая динамика воздушно-реактивных двигателей], Moscow, 1947;
- Fundamentals of the theories of air-jet engines [Основы теорий воздушно-реактивных двигателей], Moscow, 1947;
- Turbulent flows under the influence of volumetric forces and non-self-similarity [Турбулентные течения при воздействии объёмных сил и неавтомодельности] / G. N. Abramovich, S. Yu. Krasheninnikov, A. N. Sekundov . - Moscow: Mechanical Engineering, 1975. - 94 p. : crap.; 21 cm.
- Applied gas dynamics. [Прикладная газовая динамика] Moscow: Nauka, 1976 .
- Abramovich G. N., Girshovich T. A., Krasheninnikov S. Yu., Sekundov A. N., Smirnova I. P. Theory of turbulent jets [Теория турбулентных струй] / Ed. G. N. Abramovich. 2nd ed. - M.: Nauka, 1984. - 720 p.
