= Dov Ber Abramowitz =

American Orthodox rabbi and author (1860–1926)

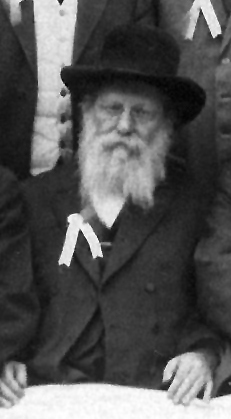
Dov Ber Abramowitz, April 1914

Dov Ber Abramowitz (Hebrew: דובר אברמוביץ; 1860 – 1926) was an American Orthodox Rabbi and author.

Born in Vabalninkas, Kovno Governorate, Russian Empire, (today part of Lithuania), he moved with his family to Jerusalem in 1870, at the age of ten. After being ordained by Rabbi Shmuel Salant, he served as a district rabbi in Jerusalem. In 1894, he immigrated to the United States. A few years later he was appointed as the chief dayyin of St. Louis. He was one of the founders of the Union of Orthodox Rabbis. He formed the first branch of Mizrachi in the United States in St. Louis and served as president of the American Mizrachi.

He died in Jerusalem, Mandate Palestine. His grandson was Abraham Leon Sachar.

== Name ==
The Yiddish name דוב-בער Dov-Ber literally means "bear-bear", traceable back to the Hebrew word דב dov "bear" and the German word Bär "bear". It is thus an example of a bilingual tautological name.
