= Jan Klimek =

Polish politician

- Born: June 12, 1953 (age 73); Chełm Śląski, Klimek
- Education: Akademia Ekonomiczna in Katowice
- Occupation: Politician

Jan Klimek (born June 12, 1953) is a Polish politician, best known as a President of Democratic Party (Stronnictwo Demokratyczne) from 1998 to 2002. He was member of Sejm for two terms (1997–2001 and 2001–2005).

Born in Chełm Śląski, Klimek is an economist (graduate of Akademia Ekonomiczna in Katowice) and a businessman, who owning a large confectionery and several baking shops.

He was first elected to the Sejm in 1997 (from Katowice), when SD was in coalition and started from Freedom Union ballots. Klimek however left Union parliamentary caucus very shortly after election in protest against forming a Union-AWS government coalition.

Before 2001 elections SD joined the Democratic Left Alliance/Labour Party coalition and Klimek won re-election. He remained in SLD caucus until 2005, when he retired from politics.
