= Moses Abramovitz =

American economist and professor

- Born: January 1, 1912; Brooklyn, New York
- Died: December 1, 2000 (aged 88); Stanford, California
- Education: Harvard University and Columbia University
- Known for: Economic history
- Spouse: Carrie Glasser (m. 1937–1999; her death)
- Children: 1
- Scientific career
- Fields: Economics and Education
- Workplaces: Stanford University

Moses Abramovitz (January 1, 1912 – December 1, 2000) was an American economist and professor. During his career, he made many contributions to the study of macroeconomic fluctuations and economic growth over time.

== Biography ==
Moses Abramovitz was born on January 1, 1912, in Brooklyn, New York, and was born and raised in a Jewish family.

He completed his bachelor's degree in economics summa cum laude at Harvard University. He went to Harvard with the intention of becoming a lawyer and studied criminal justice as well as economics. However, he became more interested in economics because he was able to connect it to the world in which he was living. He earned his Ph.D. at Columbia University in 1939. In 1985, he was awarded an honorary doctorate from the Faculty of Social Sciences at Uppsala University, Sweden. In 1992, he was invited to Rome to become a fellow of the prestigious Accademia Nazionale Dei Lincei. He was awarded another doctorate from the University of Ancona in 1992.

Abramovitz, called Moe by family and friends, was known for his modest personality and was described as one of the least ego-driven scholars in economics. He married Carrie Glasser, a Brooklyn-born economist turned painter and sculptor. She died in 1999.

Abramovitz started his career as a lecturer at Harvard in the mid-1930s. After finishing his doctorate at Columbia, he joined the National Bureau of Economic Research in New York, where he began his investigation of inventory investment cycles. During World War II, Abramovitz served on the War Production Board and in the Office of Strategic Services as chief of the European industry and trade section. In 1945 and 1946, he was an economic adviser to the United States representative on the Allied Reparations Commission. He was also a founding faculty member of the Department of Economics at Stanford University, which he joined in the fall of 1948. He taught there for almost 30 years. From 1962 to 1963, he was the adviser to the secretary general of the Organization for Economic Cooperation and Development in Paris. He then served as the organization chair from 1963 to 1965 and from 1971 to 1974. Over the course of his career, Abramovitz carried out many pioneering studies of macroeconomics and long-term growth. His 1986 article, "Catching Up, Forging Ahead and Falling Behind" is the second most cited of all the papers published by the Journal of Economic History.

Abramovitz died at Stanford Hospital in California on December 1, 2000, at the age of 88, after contracting a gastrointestinal infection.

== Theories ==
He referred to total factor productivity as a "measure of our ignorance about the causes of economic growth".

This result is surprising in the lopsided importance which it appears to give to productivity increase, and it should be, in a sense, sobering, if not discouraging, to students of economic growth. Since we know little about the causes of productivity increase, the indicated importance of this element may be taken to be some sort of measure of our ignorance about the causes of economic growth in the United States and some sort of indication of where we need to concentrate our attention.

— Moses Abramovitz, Resource and output trends in the United States since 1870 (1956)

=== Catch-up growth ===
Abramovitz's catch-up growth hypothesis attempted to explain Western Europe's Golden Era of economic growth from 1948 to 1972. He essentially concluded that the key to the growth was Western Europe's ability to import and implement technology from the United States. The growth rate of a developing country will be higher than the growth rate of a developed country because the diminishing return of developing countries is much lower. If a country is trying to be industrialized, it can only be better off; it will grow much faster than countries that are already industrialized. In the process, the country creates more jobs and more capital, which means the economy's total revenue will increase more and more quickly.

=== Limitation to catch-up growth ===
Abramovitz's theory does not guarantee that poor countries will catch up to developed countries, because the poor countries might fail to adapt to new technology, attract capital and participate in the global market.

If a country cannot adapt to the technology it is offered, it will not be able to generate more capital, which will cause the catch-up process to fail. If the country does not build relationships with developed nations, the process will also fail. Building such relationships is so important because it is developed countries that will purchase most of developing countries' capital. If the developing country sells more capital, it will grow. If it grows, it will catch up.

=== The role of inventories in business cycles ===
During his time at the National Bureau of Economics Research, Abramovitz researched the role inventories play in business cycles. A business cycle is a fluctuation in economic activity over a period of time. The fluctuation may be good, as with a boom and economic expansion, or bad, as with a recession or depression. In his paper "The Role of Inventories in Business Cycles," Abramovitz wrote that inventory can play a negative role if there is a lag in the production of the inventory. A lag can occur for the following reasons:

1. Many goods need to be produced to create one whole product. For example, to manufacture a car, several kinds of goods are required. If there is a lag in obtaining any of those goods, it slows down the production of the car. This prevents the market from meeting demand, which leads to less revenue.
2. Raw materials purchased from domestic manufacturers or dealers may lag by a few months. For example, to make fabric, many types of raw material—such as cotton, nylon, wool, and polyester—are required. If domestic manufacturers or dealers are unable to produce the raw material on time, the market will suffer because it cannot meet demand.
3. Raw materials purchased from distant sources or on long-term contracts may also arrive late. When domestic manufacturers and dealers cannot produce enough, a nation has to reach out to other nations, which takes much longer. This can also cause the market to lack products consumers want.
4. Finished goods made to order are closely tied to output. Even if raw materials are received on time and goods are produced on time, the inventory may not be enough to meet demand. Producing more requires starting from scratch. Meanwhile, the market does not have any goods to sell.

Aggregate inventories of wholesalers and retailers also appear to have lagged behind sales by about six months. Detailed studies reveal that this lag reflects large differences in the ability of merchants in different trades to keep the rate at which they receive goods in line with the rate at which they can dispose of them. Some merchants' ability to adjust inventories to sales is so limited as to produce a long lag of stocks behind sales, or even an inverse relationship between sales and inventories. If these various lags are worked out, a country can stop the negative effect of inventories on the national market.

== Publications ==
Selected publications in chronological order:

- Abramovitz, Moses (1939). Price Theory for a Changing Economy. Columbia University Press. Archived from the original on 2011-06-05 – via Questia.
- 1948: Role of Inventories in Business Cycles
- 1950: Inventories and Business Cycles
- 1954: (with V. Eliasberg) The Trend of Public Employment in Great Britain
- 1956: Resource and Output Trends in the US since 1870
- 1959: The Welfare Interpretation of National Trends in National Income and Product
- 1959: The allocation of economic resources: essays in honor of Bernard Francis Haley. Stanford, California: Stanford University Press. OCLC 287348.
- 1959: Abramovitz, Moses; et al. (eds.), "The welfare interpretation of secular trends in national income and product", The Allocation of Economic Resources: Essays in Honor of Bernard Francis Haley, Stanford, California: Stanford University Press, OCLC 490147128.
- 1961: The Nature and Significance of Kuznets Cycles
- 1964: Evidences of Long Swings in Aggregate Construction Since the Civil War
- 1968: The Passing of Kuznets Cycles
- 1973: (with David, Paul) Reinterpreting Economic Growth: Parables and Realities
- 1979: Rapid Growth Potential and Its Realization
- 1979: Economic Growth and Its Discontents
- 1986: Catching Up, Forging Ahead and Falling Behind
- 1993: Thinking About Growth and Other Essays
- The Search for the Sources of Growth: Areas of Ignorance, Old and New
- 1996: (with David, Paul) Convergence and Deferred Catch Up
- 1999: What Economists Don't Know About Growth
