= Glasser effect =

The Glasser effect describes the creation of singularities in the flow field of a magnetically confined plasma when small resonant perturbations modify the gradient of the pressure field.
