= Ludwik Abramowicz (1888–1966) =

Polish-Lithuanian activist and teacher (1888–1966)

Ludwik Abramowicz (Lithuanian: Liudvikas Abromavičius; 8 May 1888 – 5 April 1966) was a Polish–Lithuanian activist and teacher.

== Life ==
Born in Radviliškis, he studied at the University of Kiev. In 1918, he was working as a Lithuanian language teacher at a gymnasium in Telšiai, which was establishing independence from the Russian Empire during the time. Later in the interbellum period he became the director of one of the four Polish high schools in interwar Lithuania, the Adam Mickiewicz Gymnasium in Kaunas (Polish: Gimnazjum im. Adama Mickiewicza w Kownie). After the Soviet invasion, he was briefly a burmister of Telšiai. From 1945 to 1947, he worked in a repatriation office in Vilnius before moving to Poland. He died in Warsaw in 1966.
