= Alliance of Democrats (Poland) =

Alliance of Democrats Stronnictwo Demokratyczne
- Leader: Paweł Piskorski
- Founded: 18 September 1937
- Preceded by: Democratic Clubs
- Headquarters: ul. Chmielna 9, 00-021 Warsaw
- Ideology: Social democracy Christian democracy Pro-Europeanism; Until 1990: Democratic socialism
- Political position: Centre-left to left-wing Until 1990: Far-left
- National affiliation: Polish Coalition (2019)
- European affiliation: European Democratic Party
- European Parliament group: Alliance of Liberals and Democrats for Europe
- Colours: Blue; Until 1990: Red
- Sejm: 0 / 460
- Senate: 0 / 100
- European Parliament: 0 / 53

Website
- sd.pl
- Politics of Poland; Political parties; Elections; Old logo of the party, used until 1990.

The Alliance of Democrats (Polish: Stronnictwo Demokratyczne, SD), also known as the Democratic Party, is a Polish centre-left party. Initially formed in 1937, the party underwent a revival in 2009, when it was joined by liberal politician Paweł Piskorski, formerly a member of the Civic Platform.

== History ==
=== Formation (1937–1939) ===
The Alliance of Democrats has its origins in the Democratic Clubs, which were opposed to authoritarian and nationalistic tendencies in the Second Republic of Poland between the two World Wars (1919–1939). The first club was founded in Warsaw in September 1937, and by 1938 there were clubs in all major urban centres, with active participation of the co-founders of Polish independence, whose primary objective was ensuring a fully democratic political system in Poland. The group's founders came from the democratic circles of former legionaries, peasant activists, left-wing Sanationists connected to, among others, with the Union for the Repair of the Republic, as well as from the left-wing part of the Union of Work for State "Legion of the Young" and socially radical intelligentsia and youth groups. The national founding convention of the Alliance of Democrats was held on 15 April 1939. The Declaration of Policy included such issues as improvement of the national economy, a development plan to raise the level of education, and modernisation of the armed forces. Mieczysław Michałowicz, a member of the Senate, was appointed as the first party leader of the Alliance.

The Party was officially established in April 1939 at the All-Polish Founding Assembly (1st Congress) in Warsaw. The political line of the new grouping was determined by the political metrics of its leading activists and disagreement with the evolution of the "May Revolution" system limiting civil liberties. Hence, specific postulates did not at first aim at overthrow, but at a significant reform of the system towards the restitution of democratic values. Among the classic postulates were: the reform of electoral law to the Sejm and Senate, as well as a broad programme of social and economic transformations, which was characterised by a return to democratic models shaped on the basis of the actual application of the provisions of the March Constitution (inter alia, fully democratic electoral law, respect for the law and civic freedoms, radical defence of the rule of law and independence of the judiciary, criticism of nationalist and totalitarian tendencies likely to destabilise the state). The personification of the party's values and political programme thus became a citizen enjoying freedom and the achievements of the democratic system, honouring the basic communal value of labour, the creator of state power.

Despite the democratic vision of the party, the party itself was governed in an authoritarian manner and principally agreed with the guided democracy system of Sanacja and Józef Piłsudski. Thus the party was regarded as a representative of "progressive Piłsudskism", a notable expression of which was the acceptance of a presidential republic where the head of state was the most important element, harmonising the so-called excesses of parliamentarism and bureaucracy. It is impossible not to notice internal contradictions in such a construction. However, given the nature of the Polish political scene at the time and the measure of the opposition's actual influence on the activities of the post-May camp, such inconsistencies should be seen as an attempt to reconcile with the realities of the political system the elements of its own tradition of democratic overtones related to its political roots.

=== World War II years (1939–1945) ===
After the outbreak of the Second World War, the Alliance of Democrats, like other political groupings, was subject to a process of temporary disintegration. After its reactivation in autumn 1940 and the adoption of the clandestine code name 'Rectangle', the party gave unequivocal support to the legal government of the Republic of Poland in exile. The ideological declaration, published in September of that year, defined Poland as a country torn between two aggressors; hence the totalitarian Soviet ideology was considered equivalent to Nazism and characterised as criminal and alien to the Polish mentality. The majority of SD members found a place in the structures of the Polish Underground State, such as the Union for Armed Struggle (ZWZ) and later the Home Army (AK), also holding positions of responsibility there.

During World War II, a significant number of Alliance members were involved in the anti-Nazi Polish underground. One of its major leader was active in the Vila Ghetto. It was partly due to their initiative that Żegota, the Council for Aid to Jews, was founded in 1942 as well as the Social Organisation for Self-Defence. The Alliance of Democrats and other political and social organisations set up the Association of Democrats, which then entered the Council of National Unity, the Polish Underground State Parliament. In 1943 SD split into two factions, one of which supported the Polish Government-in-Exile in London, and the second co-operated with the communist Polish Workers' Party and recognized the State Country Council as the actual parliament and the Provisional Government of National Unity as the actual government of Poland. In 1945, following the Red Army seizure of Poland, two members of the Association, Eugeniusz Czarnowski and Stanisław Michałowski, were arrested by the NKVD and tried in the Stalinist-orchestrated Trial of the Sixteen, aimed at eliminating non-communist Polish political leadership.

The political programme promulgated during the occupation had the unmistakable mark of synthesising pre-war experience and taking into account the geopolitical conditions changed by the outbreak of war. Thus, in April 1943, the SD proclaimed a vision of so-called integral democracy intended to be a combination of a pluralistic state formula and democratic socio-economic relations. Postulates such as economic equality and social justice were to become the driving forces behind the proposed form of political and social itre. The Republic of Poland was perceived as an entity existing between western neo-democracies and itotalisms, hence the necessity to create a new order became the content facing the imperative of defending sovereignty. Thus, through the ideology of social egalitarianism, welfare and respect for the fundamental rights of the individual realised in a democratic republic, based on a five-part electoral law, the independence of the judiciary and the presidential system (the head of state, characterised by a superior role, appeared as a systemic bond), the realisation of a kind of third way was proposed as a developmental option for peacetime.

The London faction ceased to exist in 1945.

=== During Communism (1946–1988) ===
In the People's Republic of Poland SD became a "satellite" party of the communist Polish United Workers' Party (PZPR) regime (similar parties existed in East Germany and Czechoslovakia). Even so, the party managed to sustain its non-Marxist orientation. Nevertheless, the party did adopt socialism in its programmatic declaration, stating: "The Alliance of Democrats, seeing in the perspective of socialist Poland the foundations of its full state sovereignty and the conditions for its economic, social and cultural progress, would accompany the working masses on their march towards socialism." The theses of Marxian dialectics were also introduced into the party decalogue, raising the view of the final end of capitalism and the beginning of the era of socialism.

After the end of World War II, the leadership of the party was infiltrated by ideological communists, and included former activists supportive of the Soviet Union - the party was used as a tool of legitimacy of the newly established Communist Poland. Soviet-aligned officials started enforcing strict party discipline and uniformity, ensuring that the party, despite its name and pre-war alignment, would be a loyal part of the communist government, as a "token" liberal faction. Despite the marked predominance of crypto-communist members, there was also a liberal-democratic wing active in the SD, represented among others by Kraków activists such as Adam Krzyżanowski and Jerzy Langrod. They criticised the industrialisation carried out according to Soviet models, expressed a friendly attitude to the PSL, and attacked the new, pseudo-democratic electoral law. The Katowice SD organisation took a similar stance, verbalising its position on, among other things, an autonomous electoral list before the 1947 election to the Legislative Sejm, and officially defending the honour of Home Army soldiers, many of whom were incorporated into the Party's work in Silesia.

In January 1946, the SD announced its official, post-war program. It expressed the will to base political self-identification on the communist PWKN manifesto, but by making direct reference to the reformist tradition of the Great Sejm, the Kościuszko Uprising or the activities of the Polish Democratic Society, the party also indicated a broader than class-based basis for activity. The document's provisions postulated a system ensuring democracy in politics, socio-economic affairs and culture. The party system was to be characterised by such values as pluralism, egalitarianism and mutual recognition of powers. The new regime was to guarantee the rule of law and civil liberties, such as freedom of conscience and religion, resulting in a stable rule of law. In a programmatic nod to its own pre-war tradition, labour was seen as the basis of wealth, which in an unforced way coincided with one of the conclusions of the new power's making the working masses the formal sovereign. The basis of foreign policy was seen in cooperation and friendship with the Soviet Union.

The "socialization" of SD had the effect of reducing the social base, traditionally made up of intelligentsia circles and a growing group of craftsmen, who sought to find in the party an expression of their interests, increasingly threatened by the growing oppressiveness of the political system. The number of members of the party's structures was gradually decreasing: from 140,000 in 1945, only 48,000 remained four years later, which, given the conditions in which it operated, i.e. the de facto omnipotence of the communist party and the intensive totalisation of socio-political life, was regarded as a nevertheless relatively satisfactory result. However, democratic activists with a desire for social reform, who clearly articulated political independence and democratic subjectivity, were gradually leaving the party, despite the party constituting a relatively safe refuge from political persecution.

At their 12th Convention in 1981, the Alliance put forward proposals to establish a Tribunal of State, a Constitutional Tribunal, an Ombudsman Office, and to restore the Senate. Furthermore, the convention suggested that 3 May, the anniversary of the Constitution of 3 May 1791, should become a national holiday, as it had always been for the Alliance of Democrats. After martial law was declared in Poland in 1981, a group of MPs representing the Alliance, Hanna Suchocka, Dorota Simonides and Jan Janowski among them, voted against abolishing the Solidarity Trade Union. Some Alliance members became engaged in the activities of the anti-Communist underground opposition.

=== Fall of Communism and post-communist era (1989–2009) ===
In 1989, representatives of the Alliance of Democrats participated actively in the Round Table negotiations. Following the elections of 4 June, the Alliance, with the United People's Party and the Solidarity Civic Parliamentary Club, formed a coalition, supporting the government of Tadeusz Mazowiecki as the Prime Minister. Three Alliance members were nominated to governmental posts: Jan Jankowski as the Deputy Prime Minister, Aleksander Mackiewicz as the Domestic Market Minister and as the Minister of Communications, Marek Kucharski, who is today the Secretary General of the Alliance. At the motion of the parliamentary party of the Alliance, the anniversary of the Constitution of 3 May was proclaimed a national holiday, the state again assumed "Republic of Poland" as its name, and an eagle wearing a crown was restored as the national emblem.

After 1990, most of the members of the SD joined other parties, such as the Freedom Union. The party continued to exist, but had only a small support base, and was not represented in the Polish parliament.

=== Rebirth after 2009 ===
Due to the financial considerations required under the Polish political system, parties need to have sufficient funding to finance large-scale campaigns if they are new or have recently obtained under 3% of voters' support. The Democratic Party possessed a large number of properties, which made it possible to finance several political campaigns after sale of these properties. The value of its assets is estimated at PLN 65 to 250 million, as the Rzeczpospolita newspaper calculated.

After 2009, new politicians joined the party, such as centrist-conservative Paweł Piskorski. The party restored their representation in parliament, by taking over of the members of the Democratic Party – demokraci.pl group consisting of three members (including Marian Filar, Bogdan Lis and Jan Widacki). After Paweł Piskorski rise to the leadership of the party, many old members the of party resigned. In the 2009 European Elections, the party's candidates obtained 0.027% of votes because of registration problems and lack of organisation. Since May 2009 the Alliance of Democrats has been a member of the European Democratic Party. SD supported former Minister of Foreign Affairs Andrzej Olechowski's candidature in the 2010 presidential election. In the 2011 parliamentary elections, Alliance did not register any lists but three candidates who were enlisted on the Poland Comes First election list but were supported by SD received 0.0031% of the popular vote. The Party was to announce its new political programme at its XXVI Congress.

Before the 2019 European elections, SD declared its desire to join the European Coalition, however, none of the party members were on its electoral list. Before the 2019 parliamentary elections, SD joined the Polish Coalition. Several members were on the PSL list, but they had not won any seats in the Sejm.

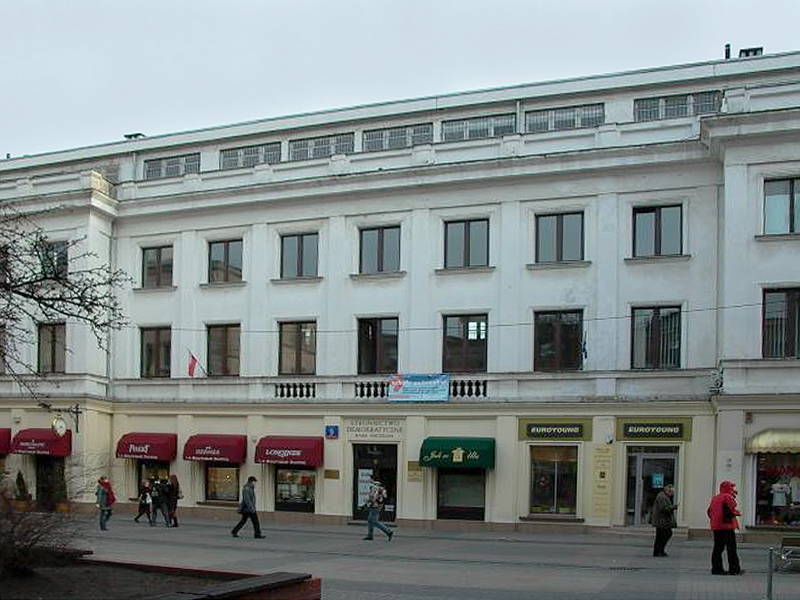
Headquarters of the SD, in Warsaw

== Ideology ==
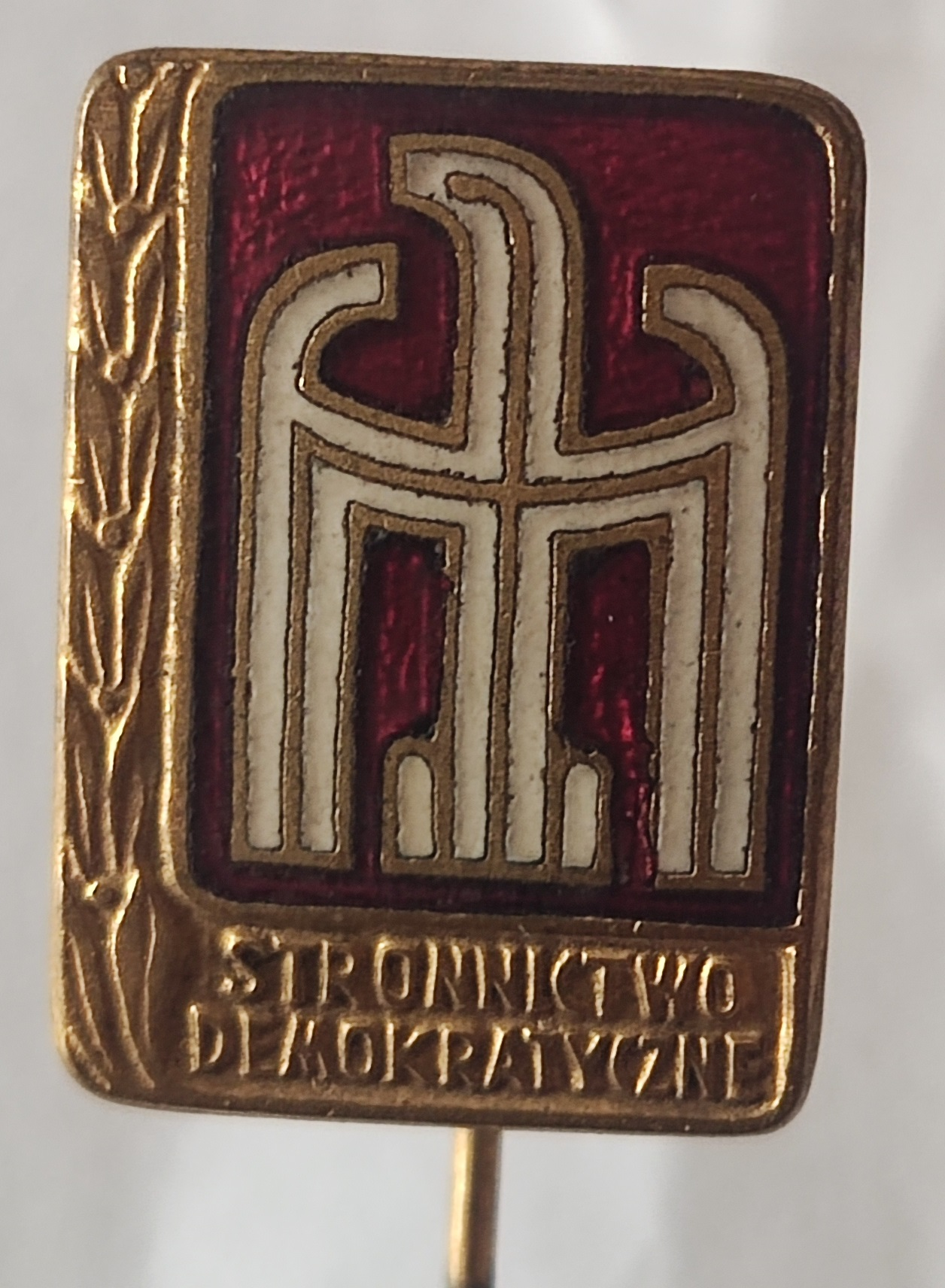
Pin of the party used until 1990.

The party incorporates liberal, social democratic and left-wing elements, which also resulted in the willingness of the party to work with the trade union movement. The party promotes state interventionism and economic planning and calls for land reform in the interests of smallholder and landless peasants. The party also proposed the development of co-operatives and the "decartelisation" of the market. The party also endorsed the concept of a "third way" between capitalism and socialism. After 1989, the party described its ideology as one that includes "both elements of the social teachings of the Church and the tenets of social democracy" and that "as a party of effective people, we want to appeal to our electorate, which consists of private businessmen, craftsmen and the intelligentsia".

== Chairmen of the party since 1939 ==
- 1939–1940 Mieczysław Michałowicz
- 1940–1942 Stanisław Więckowski
- 1942–1943 Mieczysław Bilek
- 1943–1944 Jerzy Makowiecki
- 1944–1945 Erazm Kulesza
- 1945–1949 Wincenty Rzymowski
- 1949–1956 Wacław Barcikowski
- 1956–1969 Stanisław Kulczyński
- 1969–1973 Zygmunt Moskwa
- 1973–1976 Andrzej Benesz
- 1976–1981 Tadeusz Witold Młyńczak
- 1981–1985 Edward Kowalczyk (politician)
- 1985–1989 Tadeusz Witold Młyńczak
- 1989–1990 Jerzy Jóźwiak
- 1990–1991 Aleksander Mackiewicz
- 1991–1992 Zbigniew Adamczyk
- 1992–1994 Rafał Szymański
- 1994–1998 Jan Janowski
- 1998–2002 Jan Klimek
- 2002–2006 Andrzej Arendarski
- 2006–2009 Krzysztof Góralczyk
- 2009– Paweł Piskorski

== Electoral history ==
=== Presidential ===
Election year	Candidate	1st round		2nd round	
Election year	Candidate	# of votes	% of vote	# of votes	% of vote
2025	Supported Rafał Trzaskowski	6,147,797	31.36% (#1)	10,237,286	49.11% (#2)

=== Sejm elections ===
Election	Leader	Votes	%	Seats	+/–	Position
1947	Wincenty Rzymowski	as part of Democratic Bloc		41 / 444	-	4th
1952	Wacław Barcikowski	as part of FJN - PZPR		25 / 425	▲25	▲1st
1957	Stanisław Kulczyński	as part of FJN - PZPR		39 / 459	▲14	3rd
1961	Stanisław Kulczyński	as part of FJN - PZPR		39 / 460	Steady	3rd
1965	Stanisław Kulczyński	as part of FJN - PZPR		39 / 460	Steady	3rd
1969	Stanisław Kulczyński	as part of FJN - PZPR		39 / 460	Steady	3rd
1972	Zygmunt Moskwa	as part of FJN - PZPR		39 / 460	Steady	3rd
1976	Andrzej Benesz	as part of FJN - PZPR		37 / 460	▼2	3rd
1980	Tadeusz Witold Młyńczak	as part of FJN - PZPR		37 / 460	Steady	3rd
1985	Tadeusz Witold Młyńczak	as part of PRON		35 / 460	▼2	3rd
1989	Jerzy Jóźwiak	3,961,124 (constituencies) (Note: The electoral law for the 1989 election reserved constituency seats for each of the PRON's individual member parties separately, and for independent and opposition party candidates as a whole; SD candidates could only run in the seats reserved for SD. This number of votes reflects the total number of votes cast in SD's reserved seats.)	N/A	27 / 460	▼12	▼4th
1989	Jerzy Jóźwiak	24,814,903 (in the national list) (Note: The electoral law for the 1989 election provided for a national list of prominent PRON figures; voters voted on approving or rejecting each candidate on the national list separately. Of the 35 national list candidates, 3 were nominated by SD.)	48.50% (Note: 17,053,171 votes were cast in the election of National list members; since voters voted on each candidate separately, and there were 3 SD candidates on the national list, 51,159,513 marks the maximum number of approval votes SD's national list candidates could have received.)	27 / 460	▼12	▼4th
1991	Aleksander Mackiewicz	159,017	1.4%	1 / 460	▼26	▼14th
