= Boško Abramović =

Serbian chess grandmaster (1951–2021)

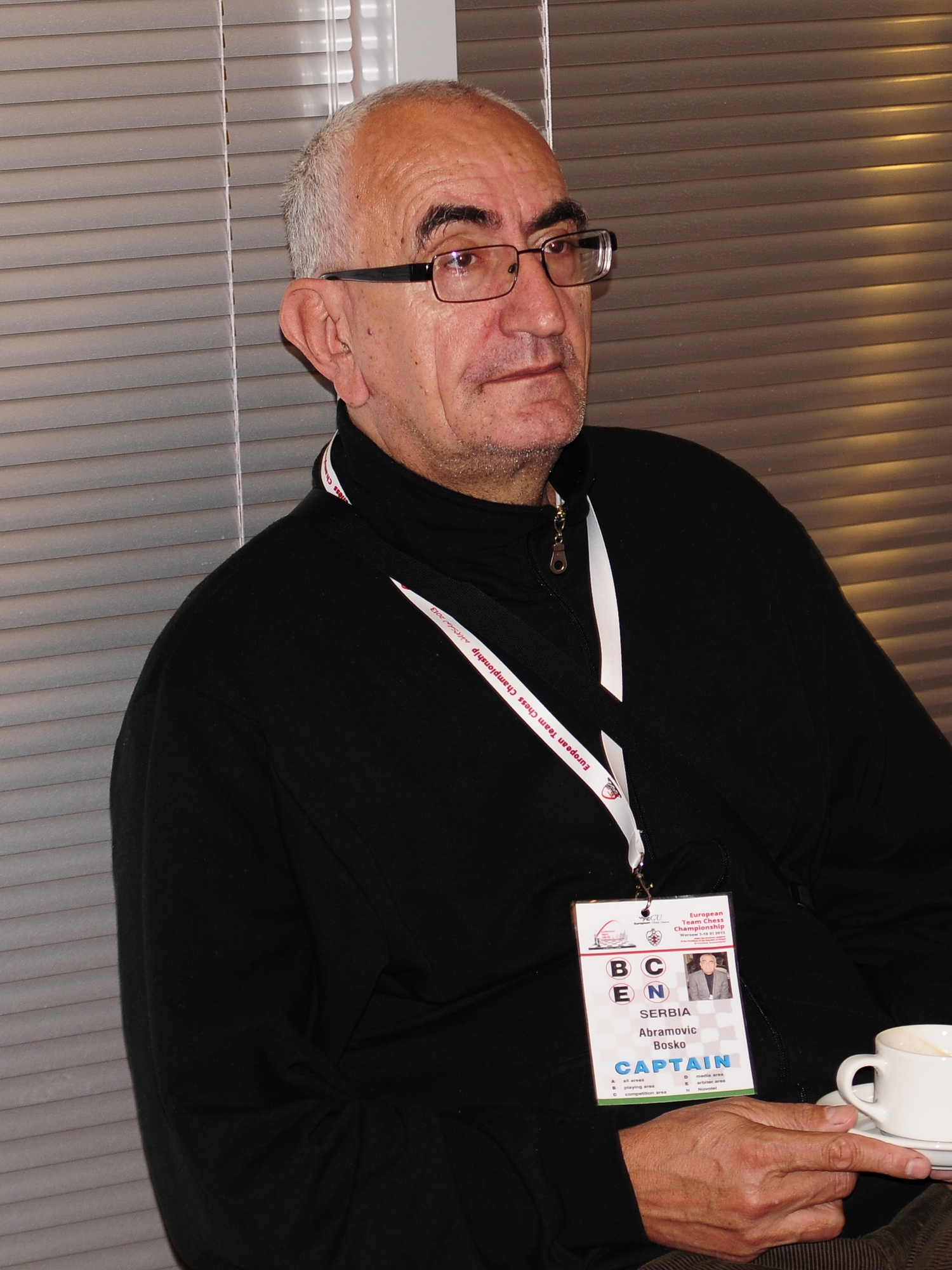
- Abramović in Warsaw in 2013

Personal information
- Born: 14 February 1951 Zrenjanin, Yugoslavia
- Died: 19 December 2021 (aged 70)

Chess career
- Country: Yugoslavia → Serbia
- Title: Grandmaster (1984)
- Peak rating: 2524 (January 2002)

Boško Abramović (Бошко Абрамовић; 14 February 1951 – 19 December 2021) was a Serbian chess grandmaster and selector of the national team.

== Career ==
Abramović was awarded the FIDE International Master title in 1980 and the grandmaster title in 1984. In international events, he was 1st at Belgrade 1984 and 2nd at Montpellier 1986. In 1993 He took 16th–20th place in the 1993 Biel Interzonal. Abramovic was also a FIDE Senior Trainer (2013).

He died on 19 December 2021, at the age of 70.

== Rating ==
(Abramović's last rating change before his death in 2021)

| Standard: 2267
| Rapid: 2227
| Blitz: 2264
