= Ludwik Bociański =

Polish certified infantry colonel

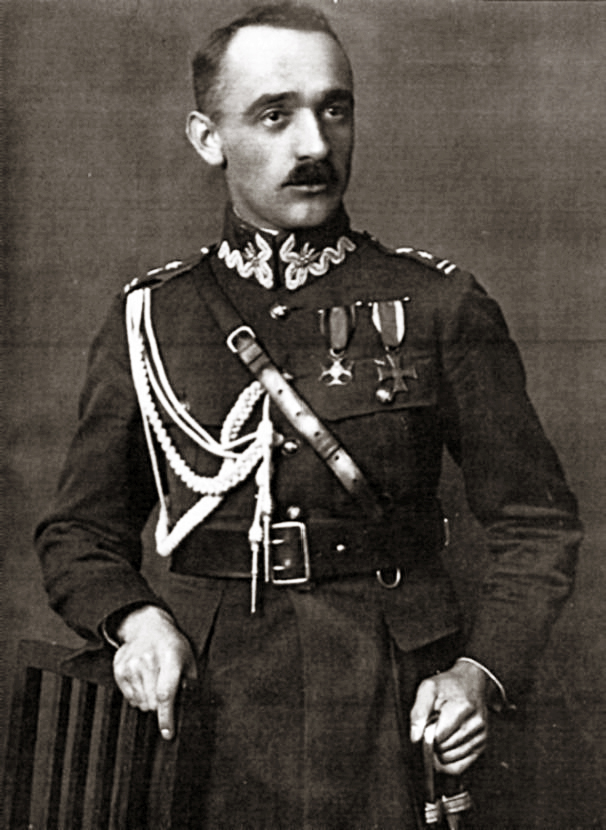
- Born: 24 August 1892 Pleszew, Kingdom of Prussia, German Empire
- Died: 7 February 1970 (aged 77) London, Great Britain
- Conflicts: World War I Greater Poland uprising (1918–1919); Polish–Soviet War

Ludwik Bociański (24 August 1892 – 7 February 1970) was a Polish certified infantry colonel of the Polish Army and the Second Polish Republic's voivode of the Poznań and Vilnius voivodeships.

== Early life ==
He was born into a peasant family as the son of Wojciech Bociański and Wiktoria Bociańska née Stefaniak. His brother Jan Bociański was a diplomat, and his sister Maria Bociańska-Radomska - a participant in the Greater Poland Uprising and a social activist.

He studied at the Royal Gymnasium in Ostrów Wielkopolski and at the Gymnasium in Kępno, where he passed his final exams in 1913. He was the founder of the scout team.

== World War I ==
In 1914, he was called up to the Imperial German Army, served as a second lieutenant of artillery on the Western Front, was wounded in the battle of Verdun, was also decorated and promoted several times. In August 1917, due to an illness, he was hospitalized and did not return to the front, he served in Greater Poland. He was a member of the Polish Military Organisation of the Prussian Partition. He was one of the main organizers of the insurgent conspiracy in Greater Poland.

== Post-World War I clashes (1918–1920) ==
=== Greater Poland uprising (1918–1919) ===
From the beginning, he took an active part in the Greater Poland uprising, first in Poznań, and then in the south of Poznań, fighting at the head of the Pleszew Rifle Battalion organized by himself, with whom, among others, took over Ostrów Wielkopolski. He organized the 8th Greater Poland Infantry Regiment (renamed in 1920 as the 62nd Greater Poland Infantry Regiment). Initially, he commanded the 1st Battalion, then the entire regiment.

=== Polish–Soviet War (1919–1920) ===
In 1919, Bociański joined the organizing of the Grudziądz Rifle Regiment, soon numbered the 64th, which he commanded until 28 October 1921. He fought with the Bolsheviks on the Bug River. The regiment took part in the Battle of Warsaw as part of the 16th Infantry Division.

== Interwar (1920–1939) ==
In October 1921, he was appointed to a one-year training course at the Military Academy in Warsaw. In 1922, after completing the course, he received the title of officer of the General Staff and was assigned to the Office of the Strict War Council as a clerk in Department IIIa. During this period, he also played as a left winger in the Polonia Bydgoszcz football team.

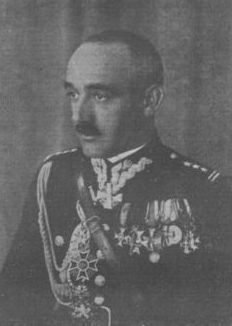
Col. Ludwik Bociański in 1939

From February 1924, he was the head of the Intelligence Department of the General Staff's Second Department. In the May Coup of 1926, he decidedly sided with Józef Piłsudski, who appreciated his loyalty and kept him in his position. In March 1927, he was appointed commander of the 86th Infantry Regiment in Maladzyechna. There, on his initiative, a monument to the fallen soldiers was built in the shape of an arch with the chapel of the Mother of God on the top, later called the Minsk Gate of Dawn. The consecration was made by Bishop Władysław Bandurski in the presence of President of Poland Ignacy Mościcki.

From July 1, 1930, to November 7, 1934, he was the commander of the Infantry Cadets School in Ostrów Mazowiecka-Komorowo. It was there that Bociański introduced the saber to the ceremony of appointment to the first officer rank, a custom that has been maintained until modern times. Cadets from his school, dressed in historical uniforms, formed an honor guard in front of the Belweder Palace on the anniversary of November Night that started the November Uprising. Then he was appointed to the position of divisional infantry commander of the 20th Infantry Division in Baranavichy.

In the order application, General Kazimierz Fabrycy wrote about him, that

Colonel Bociański, in each position he held, was distinguished by outstanding initiative and, as an eminently ideological officer, his work brought great benefits to the army.

In the elections in November 1930, he was elected a deputy to the 3rd Sejm from constituency No. 37 (Ostrów Wielkopolski), but in January 1931 he resigned from his parliamentary seat.

=== Voivode of Vilnius (1935–1939) ===
From the end of 1935 he was the voivode of Vilnius. He was criticized by the region's non-Polish inhabitants and the opposition, as well as part of the post-war Polish emigrants. Among other things, on 11 February 1936, he issued a memorial that assumed the limitation of the rights of the Lithuanians and Belarusians (this document was published in 1939 by the printing house in Kaunas). He interfered in religious affairs, tried to oust the Belarusian Marianist Fathers of Druya by initiating the erection of a new Roman Catholic parish; finally he displaced them without waiting for the decision of the clerical hierarchy.

Due to Bociański's intervention, Czesław Miłosz was fired for broadcasting Belarusian songs. For this reason, Bociański was mentioned (in a negative light) by the poet in Toast.

=== Voivode of Poznań (1939 May–September) ===
From 25 May 1939, Bociański held the office of the Poznań Voivode.

== World War II ==
During the invasion of Poland, he left Poznań. On September 6, 1939, he was appointed as the government's chief quartermaster. On September 17, 1939, on the border bridge at Cheremosh in Kuty, he blocked the way for the Commander-in-Chief, Edward Rydz-Śmigły, who intended to leave the country. Faced with the failure of persuasion, he tried to take his own life in protest. Bociański's attempt was unsuccessful, and the seriously injured Bociański was transported to Romania, where he was interned.

After a period of internment, he made his way to Western Europe. Despite his attempts, he was not assigned to the Polish Armed Forces in the West.

== Post-World War II ==
In 1947, he settled in Great Britain. While living in exile, he did not get involved in the political life of emigrant circles, but kept in touch with veterans' organizations and wrote occasional articles. He donated several dozen volumes of scientific publications in the field of Polish philology, anthropology, archeology and military history to the library of the Polish Scientific Society Abroad.

He died on February 7, 1970, in London and is buried in Gunnersbury Cemetery. In 2009, on the initiative of Michał Karalus, the starost of Pleszew, the ashes of Col. Ludwik Bociański - in accordance with his last will - were brought to his hometown of Pleszew and laid with military honors in the quarters of the Greater Poland insurgents at the cemetery at Kaliska street.

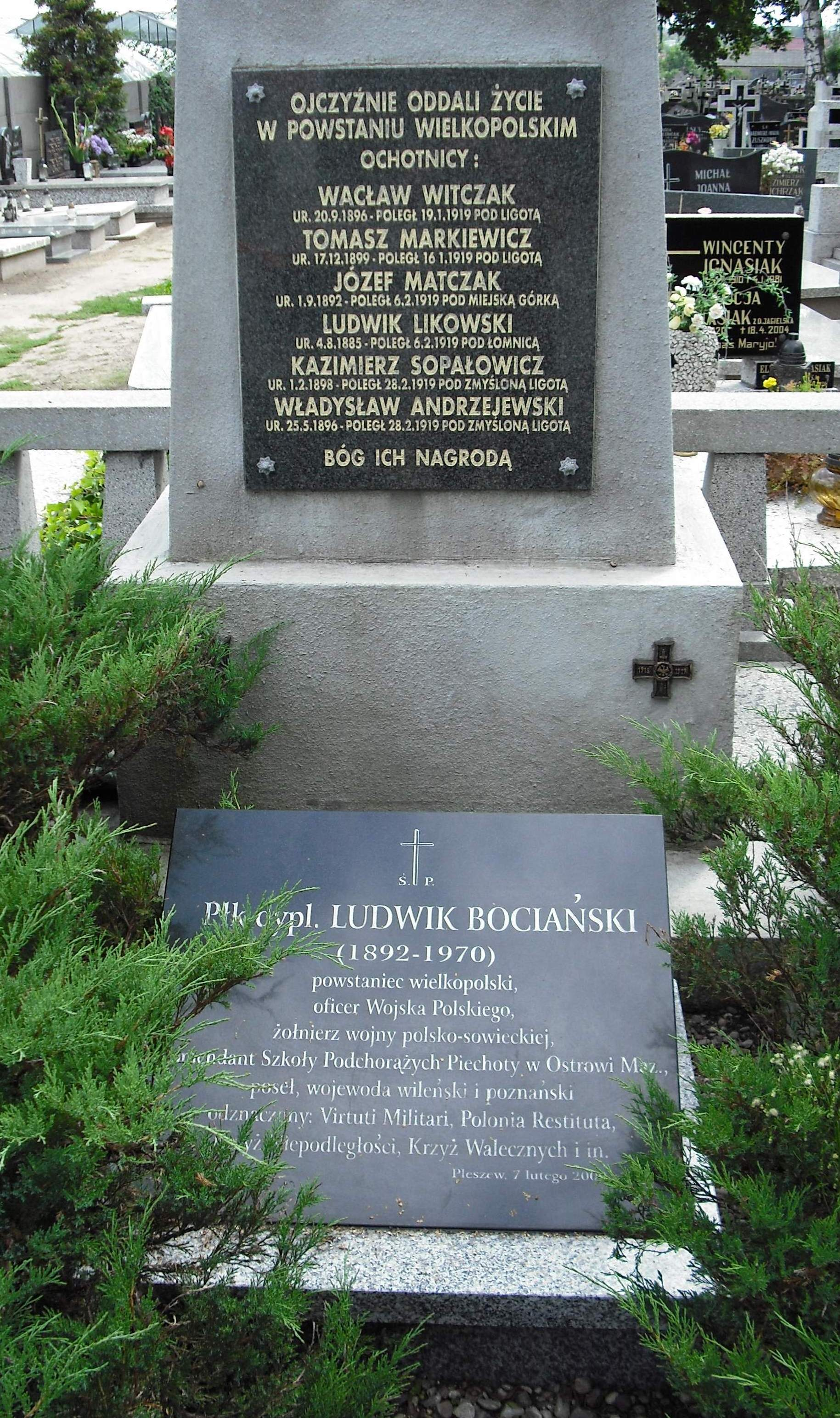
Cemetery in Pleszew, memorial plaque placed after the repatriation of Bociański's ashes

Bociański did not start a family. According to Leon Chajn, Bociański was a freemason.

== Orders and decorations ==
- Silver Cross of the Order of Virtuti Militari No. 1560 (February 19, 1922)
- Commander's Cross of the Order of Polonia Restituta (November 11, 1936)
- Cross of Independence with Swords (September 17, 1932)
- Officer's Cross of the Order of Polonia Restituta (November 9, 1932)
- Cross of Valour (before 1923)
- Gold Cross of Merit (April 29, 1925)
- Commemorative Medal for the War of 1918–1921
- Iron Cross 2nd Class (Prussia, before 1918)
- Commander's Cross of the Order of the White Lion (Czechoslovakia, awarded 1928)
- Commander's Cross of the Order of the Crown of Romania (Romania, before 1928)
- Commander's Cross of the Order of the Three Stars (Latvia, before 1928)
- Commander's Cross of the Order of the White Rose of Finland (Finland, awarded 1927)
- Officer's Cross of the Order of the White Eagle (Yugoslavia, before 1928)
- Knight's Cross of the Legion of Honour (France, before 1928)

The original orders and decorations of Ludwik Bociański are permanently attached to the pedestal of the sculpture of Our Lady of Kozielsk in the St Andrew Bobola Church in London, where they were placed as thanksgiving gifts.

== Commemoration ==
- The following schools bear the name of Ludwik Bociański: the Public School Complex in Komorów and the Technical School and Basic Vocational School in Marszewo, as well as a housing estate in Pleszew and a street in Komorów;
- Commemorative plaques in honor of Ludwik Bociański have been hung: on the building of the Wielkopolska Voivodeship Office in the "Great Poles" gallery, on the front wall of the District Office in Pleszew and in the building of the Primary School in Komorów.
- In 2012, Tomasz Wojtala's book BOCIUN. Płk dypl. Ludwik Bociański (1892–1970) was published in Pleszew.

=== Publications ===
- O posunięciach władz administracji ogólnej w stosunku do mniejszości litewskiej w Polsce oraz o zamierzeniach w tym względzie na przyszłość (About the actions of the general administration authorities in relation to the Lithuanian minority in Poland and about plans for the future in this regard), which was a top secret material intended for the Minister of the Interior, published in Kaunas in 1939.

== Bibliography ==
- Chajn, Leon (1984). Polskie wolnomularstwo: 1920–1938 (in Polish). Czytelnik. ISBN 83-07-00952-9.
- Krzak, Andrzej (2010). "Pułkownik Dyplomowany Ludwik Bociański – Oficer i Wojewoda" (PDF). Rocznik Archiwalno-Historyczny Centralnego Archiwum Wojskowego (in Polish). 3 (32). Archived from the original (PDF) on 5 March 2016.
- Kunert, A. K.; Walkowski, Z. (2005). Kronika kampanii wrześniowej 1939 (in Polish). Warsaw: Wydawnictwo Edipresse Polska. ISBN 83-60160-99-6.
- MSW (1928). Rocznik Oficerski 1928 (in Polish). Warsaw: Ministerstwo Spraw Wojskowych.
- Wojciechowski, Sławomir (2011). Zapomniane Pokolenie. Polonia Bydgoszcz 1920–1949 (in Polish). Bydgoszcz.
- Wojtala, Tomasz (2012). "Bociun" płk dypl. Ludwik Bociański (1892-1970) (PDF) (in Polish). Pleszew. ISBN 978-83-924749-6-8.
