= Marian Filar (politician) =

Polish lawyer (1942–2020)

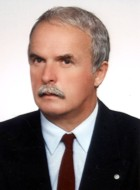
Marian Filar

Marian Filar (6 October 1942 – 1 June 2020) was a Polish lawyer, academic and politician who served as a member of the Sejm from 2007 to 2011.
