= Manuel Abramowicz =

Belgian teacher (born 1967)

Manuel Abramowicz (born 1967) is a Belgian teacher.

In his student years, he was a member of the youth wing of the trotskyist Parti ouvrier socialiste. Manuel Abramowicz was also associated with SOS Racisme-Belgium and the FGTB, the trade-union linked with the social democratic Parti socialiste.

Since 1997, he is editor-in-chief of the non-profit ResistanceS online magazine, then blog.

Manuel Abramowicz has also co-realized some film documentaries, and is a founding member of the Mémoire & Politique organization.

== Bibliography ==
- Rapport sur l'antisémitisme en 1989 en Belgique, Union des déportés juifs en Belgique, Brussels, 1990
- "Antisémitisme, une filiation historique", in Hugues Le Paige (ed.)Le désarroi démocratique, éditions Labor, 1995, pp. 139–150
- Extrême droite et antisémitisme en Belgique de 1945 à nos jours, EVO, 1993
- Les Rats noirs. L'extrême droite en Belgique francophone, Luc Pire, 1996
- (with W. Haelsterman), La représentation électorale des partis d'extrême-droite, Courrier hebdomadaire n° 1567–1568, Centre de recherche et d'information socio-politiques (CRISP), 1997.
- (written with Pierre Guyau-Genon), Nakam (novel) Ancre rouge, 1998;
- Guide des résistances à l'extrême droite, with a preface of Xavier Mabille, éditions Labor, 2005;
- Degrelle et ses disciples, Aden Belgique, 2009.
