= Carrie Abramovitz =

American sculptor, painter, economist (1913–1999)

- Born: Carrie Glasser; 1913; Brooklyn, New York, U.S.
- Died: October 19, 1999 (aged 85–86); Stanford, California, U.S.
- Education: Brooklyn College (BA), Columbia University (PhD)
- Occupations: Sculptor, painter, collagist, economist
- Spouse: Moses Abramovitz (m. 1937–1999; her death)
- Children: 1

Carrie Abramovitz (née Carrie Glasser; 1913 – October 19, 1999) was an American sculptor, painter, collagist, and economist. She lived in Palo Alto, and Stanford, California for many years. She primarily worked in wood, cast stone, and slate sculptures.

== Early life and education ==
Carrie Abramovitz was born as Carrie Glasser in 1913, in Brooklyn, New York City, New York (state). Her parents were Sarah and Abraham Glasser.

Glasser graduated with a B.A. degree in 1933 from Brooklyn College; and a PhD in 1940 in economics from Columbia University in New York City. Glasser and Moses Abramovitz married in 1937, he was a classmate and also an economics graduate student.

== Career ==
After 1940, Abramovitz worked at the Federal Communications Commission (FCC), and for the Bureau of Labor Statistics (BLS) where she served as the editor of Monthly Labor Review. She remained in the field of economics for 15 years.

In 1948, she moved to Palo Alto, California, where her husband worked as economics faculty at Stanford University in nearby Stanford, California.

Her son was born in 1950, after in which she took up painting. By 1954, she started working in sculpture. She primarily worked in wood, cast stone, and slate for her sculptures. Abramovitz sourced her wood from California walnut trees, and the slate was from quarries in Vermont, Pennsylvania, and Italy. She was awarded the Adele Hyde Morrison Memorial Medal (1961) at the Northern California Sculpture Annual at the Oakland Art Gallery (now Oakland Museum of California).

In her later career, Abramovitz had spinal surgery, and focused on collage.

== Death and legacy ==
Abramovitz died at age 86 on October 19, 1999, at Stanford University Medical Center, the private hospital affiliated with Stanford University School of Medicine. She was survived by her husband and son.

After her death the Palo Alto Art Center offers a memorial, the Carrie Abramovitz Scholarship for emerging artists. Her work is part of the Palo Alto Public Art collection; one of her bas relief sculpture pieces, Separation (1969), is displayed at the Downtown Palo Alto Library at 270 Forest Avenue.

== Exhibitions ==
- 1969, Paintings by Marilyn Mittelman and Sculptures by Carrie Abramovitz, Gallery House, 538 Ramona Street, Palo Alto, California
- 1972, Carrie Abramovitz Retrospective, solo exhibition, Syntex Art Gallery at Stanford Industrial Park, 3401 Hillview Avenue, Palo Alto, California
- 1973, New Sculptural Works in Slate And Bronze By Carrie Abramovitz, Galerie Smith–Andersen, 200 Homer Street, Palo Alto, California
- 1974, Recent Sculptures, solo exhibition, Tresidder Memorial Union at Stanford University, Stanford, California
- 1986, Sculptural Images in Collage, solo exhibition, Smith Andersen Editions Gallery, 200 Homer Street, Palo Alto, California
- 1999, Carrie Abramovitz Collages, Iris and B. Gerald Cantor Center for Visual Arts (now Cantor Arts Center), Stanford University, Stanford, California
