= Witold Abramowicz (scientist) =

Polish academic

- Awards
- Scientific career
- Fields: economics
- Institutions: Poznań University of Economics and Business

Witold Abramowicz is a Polish scientist, professor of economics, postdoctoral degree in mathematics and engineer, chair of the Department of Information Systems at PUEB. He received the Knight's Cross of the Polonia Restituta Cross in 2019.
