= Wincenty Rzymowski =

Polish politician and writer

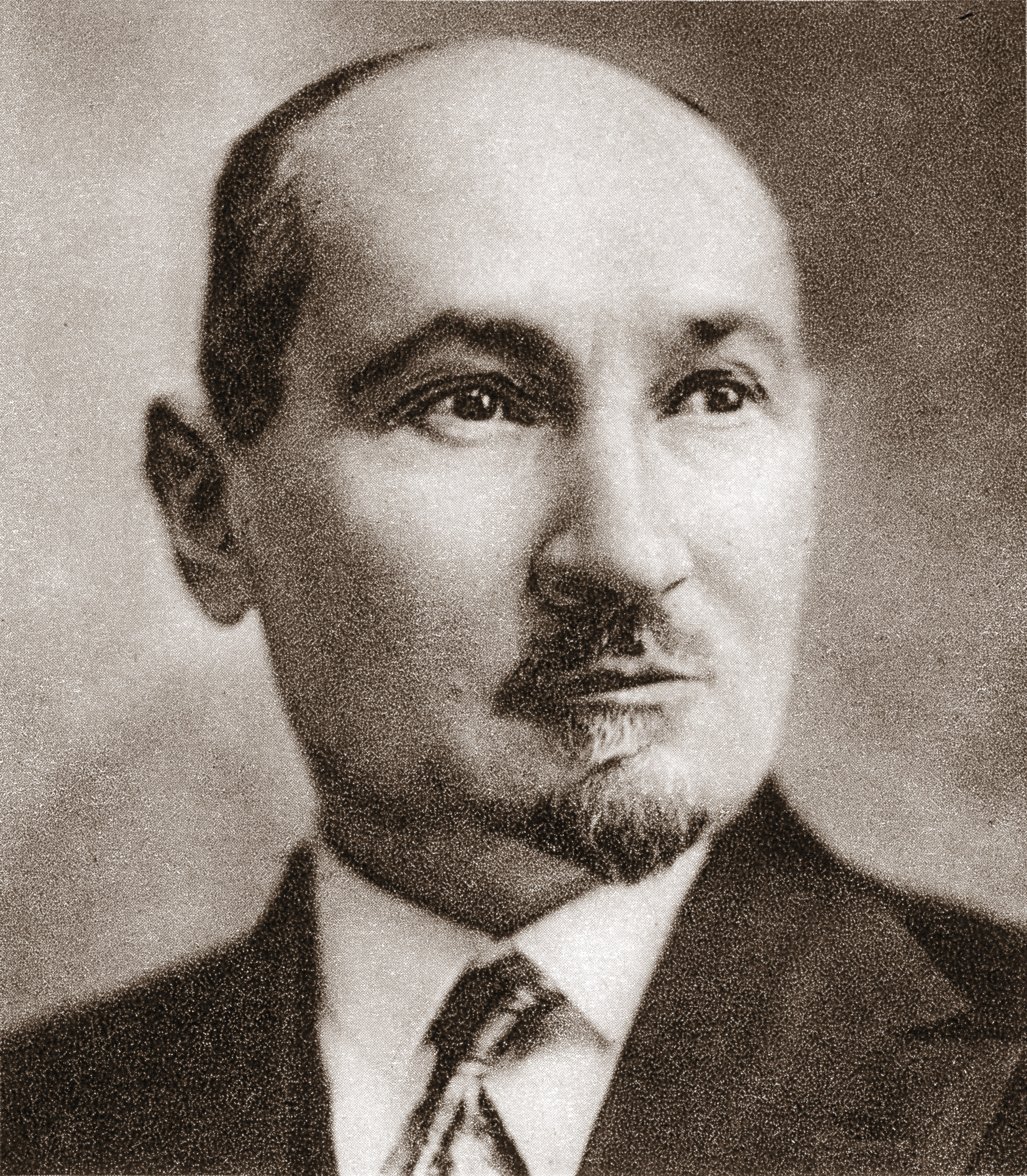

Minister of Foreign Affairs
- In office June 1945 – 6 February 1947
- Preceded by: Edward Osóbka-Morawski
- Succeeded by: Zygmunt Modzelewski

Minister of Culture
- In office 21 June 1944 – 2 May 1945
- Preceded by: Zygmunt Kaczyński
- Succeeded by: Edmund Zalewski

Personal details
- Born: 19 June 1883 Kuczbork-Osada, Congress Poland, Russian Empire
- Died: 30 April 1950 (aged 66) Warsaw, Polish People's Republic
- Party: Polish United Workers' Party
- Education: Odesa University
- Profession: Politician, diplomat, writer
- Awards: Order of the Banner of Labour; Order of Polonia Restituta; Medal for Warsaw 1939–1945; Medal of Victory and Freedom 1945; Order of the Star of the Romanian Socialist Republic; Order of Stara Planina

Wincenty Rzymowski (19 July 1883 – 30 April 1950) was a Polish politician and writer.

== Career ==
In the Second Polish Republic, Wincenty Rzymowski was a member of the Democratic Party and a known publicist. He was also forced to resign his membership in the Polish Academy of Literature in a controversy involving allegations of plagiarism.

During World War II he began working with the Soviets. He joined the Union of Polish Patriots, was a Minister of Arts and Culture in the Polish Committee of National Liberation and a Minister of Foreign Affairs in the Provisional Government of National Unity, formed by Stalin. He represented Poland during the signing of the United Nations Charter. In January 1946, he was a Soviet candidate for the position of the first Secretary General of the United Nations, but opposed by the United States. The two powers eventually compromised on Trygve Lie, a socialist from Norway.

Wincenty Rzymowski was also a deputy to the State National Council and Legislative Sejm. From 1947 till the end of his life he was a minister without portfolio in the Polish communist government.
