= Ostoja coat of arms =

Polish coat of arms

Ostoja
- Battle cry: Hostoja, Ostoja
- Alternative names: Hostoja, Mościc, Ostojczyk
- Earliest mention: 1232 (seal of Nicolaus Ostoja de Stiboricz)
- Cities: Konstantynów Łódzki, Terespol, Skierbieszów
- Families: 205 names Ancient lines - 150 Lords of Ostoja Balicki, Bańkowski (Bankowski), Baliński, Banczelski, Baranowski, Bartkowski (Bartoszewski), Bąduski, Bątkowski, Bębnowski, Biel, Bielski, Bieńkowski, Biestrzykowski, Blinowski, Błaszkowski, Błociszewski', Bobinski, Bogusławski, Boguszewski, Borowieski, Bratkowski, Brokowski, Broniowski, Bzowski, Bukowski, Chechelski Chełmski, Chocienski, Chodorkowski, Chotkowski, Chrostowski, Chrościcki, Chrząstowski, Chyżyński (Chyżewski), Ciechański, Cieszęcicki, Cieśliński, Czernikowski, de Gord, Dembowski (Dębowski), Dmosicki (Dmościcki), Dmuszewski, Dubaniewski (Dobaniowski), Dubikowski, Dobromirski, (cDomaradzki (Domaracki), Dudkowski (Dutkowski), Dulowski, Dzieczyński, Gajewski, Gawłowski, Glewski, Głazowski (Głazewski), Głębocki, Głodowski, Głogiński, Gniady, Godziszewski, Gorkowski, Halczyński, Ilikowski, Iłowiecki, Iwański, Jackowski, Jajkowski (Jaykowski), Janikowski, Janiszewski, Jański, Jerzykowski, Kamieński, Karabczewski (Krabczyjowski, Karapczewski), Karliński, Kaweczyński (Kawieczyński), Kiedrowski, Kiedrzyński, Klonowski, Kobylski, Komorowski, Kondradzki (Kondracki), Kośniewski, Koźniewski (Kożniewski), Kowalkowski, Kreza, Krępski (Kempski), Książnicki, Kropidła, Krzelczycki (Krzylczycki), Krzyczkowski, Krzywicki, Latkowski, Leksycki, Leski (Lenski, Łęski), Lniski, Łowiecki (Łowicki), Lubicki, Lubiatowski, Lubochowski, de Łopuszna, Łuczanowski, Łukowicki, Maleczkowski, Marchocki, Markiewicz (Markowicz), Marylski, Niedzwiedzki (Niedzwiecki, Miedzwiecki), Mietelski, Mioduszewski, Modrzejowski (Modrzejewski, Modrzewski), Mościcki, Nagórski (Nagorski), Olewiński (Oliwiński), Osieczkowski (Osiczkowski), Ostaszewski, Ostojski, Owsiany, Oziębłowski, Pęgowski, Pękowski, Piaszczyński, Pilawski, Podwysocki, Politalski (Politański), Poniecki, Potocki, Postrumieński, Radogowski (Radogorski), Raduński, Rokosz (Rekosz), Roguski, Rożniatowski, Ryk, Rylski, Rysiński, Sarbski, Sędzimir (Sendzimir), Siedlecki, Sieradzki, Skórka, Skrzyszewski (Skrzyszowski, Skrzeszewski), Słoński, Smuszewski (Smoszewski), Solecki, Stachorski (Stachurski, Stachera), Starzewski (Starzeski), Staszewski, Stobiecki, Strzałkowski (Strzałka), Suchorabski (Suchorębski), Świerczyński (Swierczyński), Ściborski, Szyszkowski, Targoński, Teliński, Turznicki (Turnicki), Unichowski, Wadowski, Woynowski, Zabierzowski, Zaborowski (Zborowski), Zagórski (Zagorski, Zagurski), Zajarski (Zajerski), Zakobielski, Żelisławski. Ancient Lithuanian and Ruthenian lines of Ostoja - 23 Lords of Ostoja: Ancyparowicz, Błyszczanowicz, Boratynski, Brodowicz, Czechowicz, Czeczot, Danielewicz (Danilewicz), Darowski, Hrebnicki Doktorowicz, Gajdowski-Potapowicz, Kaczanowski, Karlewicz, Krzywiec (Okołowicz), Kublicki (Piottuch-Kublicki), Kumanowski, Kurosz, Mokrzecki, Nieradzki, Palecki, Pietrzkiewicz (Wadowski-Pietrzkiewicz), Raczko, Słuszka, Tumiłowicz. Other verified lines - 32 families: Bohatyrewicz (Bohatyrowicz), Bochuszewicz, Chudziński (Chudzyński), Dworzecki (Dworecki, Dworzecki-Bohdanowicz), Głowczewski (Kłopotek-Głowczewski), Gołąbek-Kowalski, Grądzki, Hełczyński, Jakliński, Jotejko (Joteyko), Kałłaur, Kątkowski (Kontkowski), Kotnowski, Kozłowiecki, Lubochoński (Lubochiński), Miklaszewicz (Mikłaszewicz), Miklaszewski, Mikorski, Ochocki, Piestrzecki, Podgorski, Raczewski, Rudziecki, Rumszewicz, Samborski, Samorok (Samorak, Sumorok), Siedlikowski, Siedliski, Siemoński, Starzycki, Suchcicki, Ulejski (Uleski) Not verified lines - 29 families: Barankiewicz (tatar origin), Bociarski, Bogorajski - nob, Bohuszewicz (Boguszewicz), Chodkowski, Chrostecki, Chrostowski, Duczman, Duszakiewicz, Gajewicz, Glindzicz, Gołębiowski, Hulanicki, Juckiewicz, Kończycki, Krall - nob, Mikutowicz, Modliszewski, Nagórczewski, Nagorski - nob, Nyko (Nyka, Nyk), Osiejewski, Ostaniewicz, Palczyński, Pankiewicz, Siemienowicz, Stackiewicz, Stebelski, Trzecieniecki Not verified and most probably not belonging to the Clan of Ostoja - 77 families: Bardecki, Bęczelski, Biestrzecki, Błoszczyński, Chełmowski, Chocimowski, Chotkowicz, Chudzicki, Czapiewski, Domontow, Dreling, Dulski, Elżanowski, Glokman, Gralewski, Hajewski, Hubnicki, Jakowicki, Kargowski, Kasprzycki, Kleczewski, Kłębowski, Kołodziejski, Konczyński, Krzelewski, Lutomirski, Mokrzewski, Mosalski, Nasierowski, Nass, Nos, Ochocimski, Oczepowski, Orda (Ordyniec, Ordyński - tatars of Orda Coa), Osiecki, Ostanowski, Ostarzewski, Ostaszewicz, Ostyłowski, Przeszmiński, Raduński (tatar, extinct), Rafalski, Raszewski, Redej (Rhedey), Rozkoszewski, Rudołtowski, Rzepliński, Rzymczykowski, Słupski, Stachelski, Steblecki, Strzelecki, Sułecki, Szczoskowski, Szmigłowski, Szyszko, Trzebnicki, Tucznia, Tołkacz, Tomkiewicz, Turkułł, Tworowski, Ubliński, Ustarbowski, Wasilewski, Wojtkiewicz, Woyszyk, Wyrzek, Wróblewski, Zabokrzycki, Zakrzewski, Zarogowski, Zasztowt, Zębedey, Zdaniszewski, Złoszcz.

Ostoja is a Polish coat of arms that probably originated from Sarmatian Tamga and refer to Royal Sarmatians using Draco standard. Following the end of the Roman Empire, in the Middle Ages it was used by Ostoja family in Lesser Poland and later also in Kujavia, Mazowsze and Greater Poland. It is a coat of arms of noble families that fought in the same military unit using battle cry Hostoja or Ostoja, and that applied their ancient heritage on the coat of arms, forming a Clan of knights. Later, when the Clan expanded their territory to Pomerania, Prussia, Slovakia, Hungary and Romania they also adopted a few noble families of Ruthenian origin that in 14-15th century settled down in Lithuania, Belarus and Ukraine, finally turning into the Clan of Ostoja. As different lines of the clan formed surnames after their properties and adding the adoptions, Ostoja was also recognized as CoA of several families that was not necessary connected to the original Clan, forming Heraldic clan.

== History and notable members ==
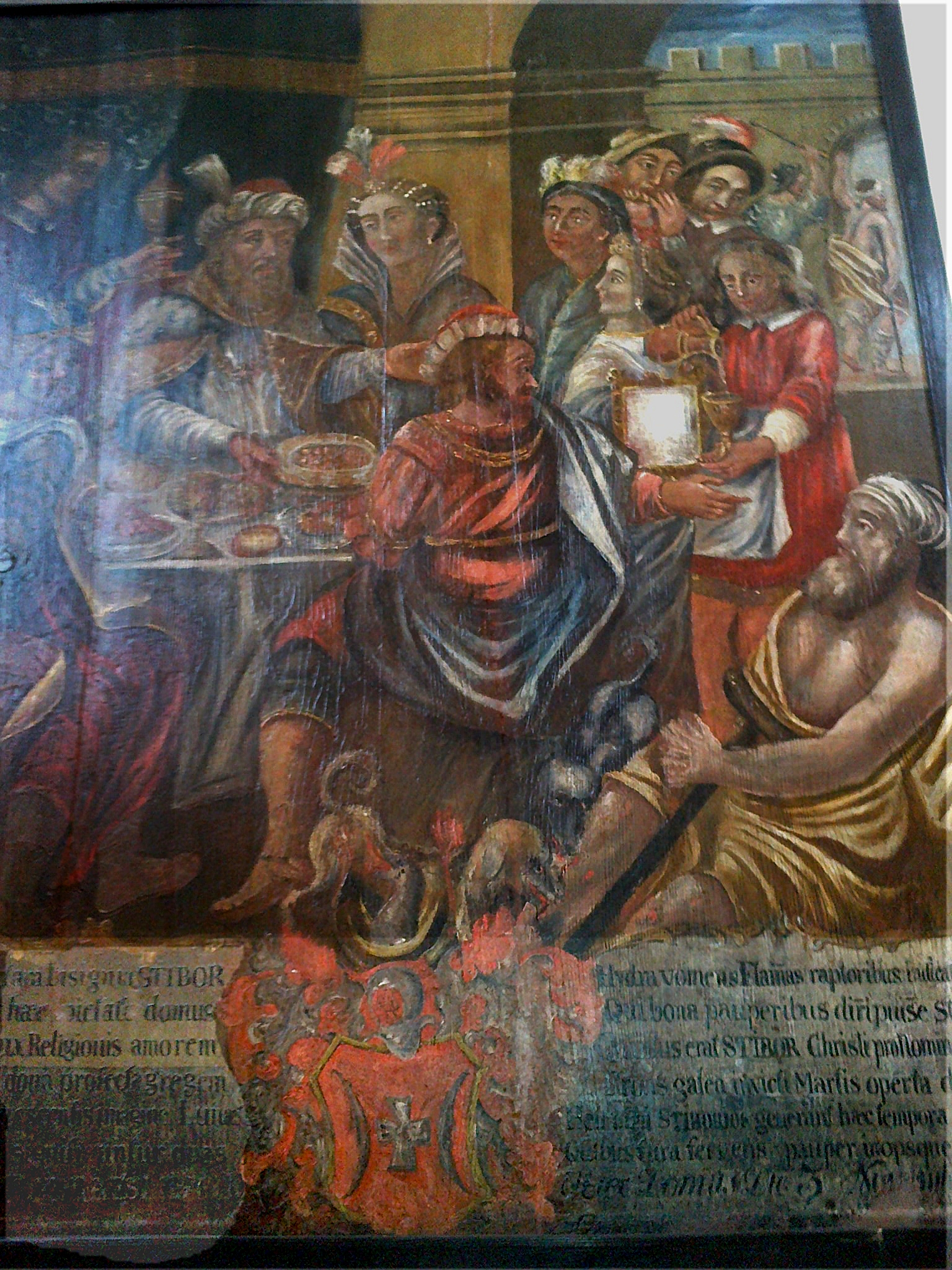
In the name of charity of Stibor's

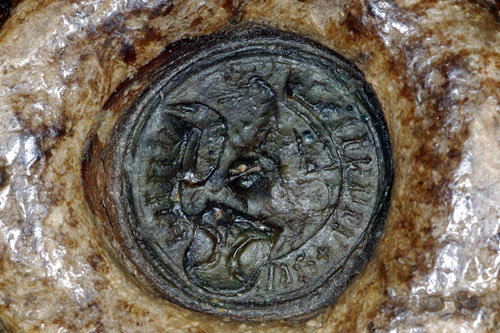
Seal of Stibor de Poniec year 1466

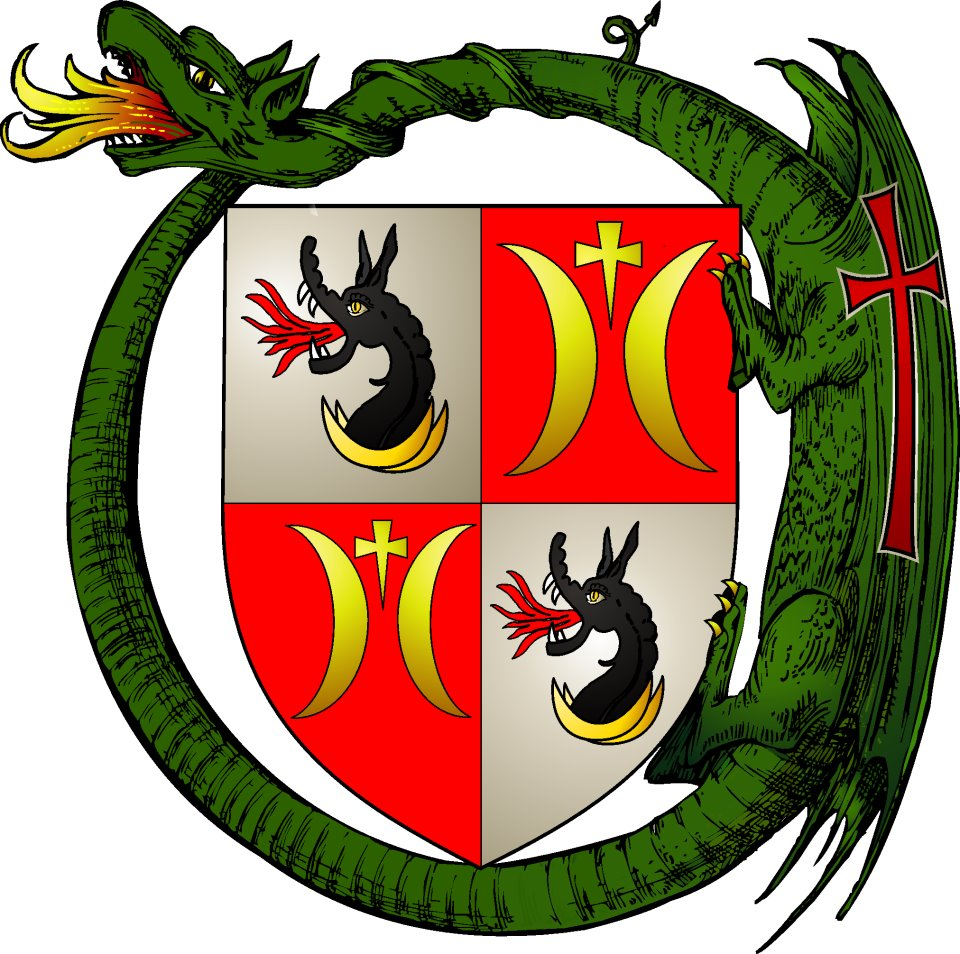
Reconstruction of Ostoja of Stibor being member of the Order of the Dragon

== Blazon ==
Original version: the coat of arms of the medieval version differed significantly from the generalized form in later times. The following reconstruction appearance comes from Josef Szymanski: Gules, between an increscent and a decrescent a cross in pale point downwards, all Or. On a helmet a dragon Sable, exhaling fire Gules, on two crescents pointing up, Or. Mantling Sable, lined Or

Modern version from the 17th century replaced a cross between crescents with the sword in pale point downwards. On a crowned helmet, five ostrich feathers.

The last image is of the seal of Dobieslaw de Koszyce from 1381 that is identical to an early sign found on the entry of the church in Wysocice of Nicolaus Ostoja de Sciborzyce (Lesser Poland) from about 1232.

Original Ostoja coat of arms

Modern Ostoja coat of arms from the 17th century

Variant of modern Ostoja coat of arms

Ostoja of Sędzimir

Coat of arms of Count Ostoja

Coat of arms of Baron Ostoja

Ostoja of Duke Stibor of Stiboricz

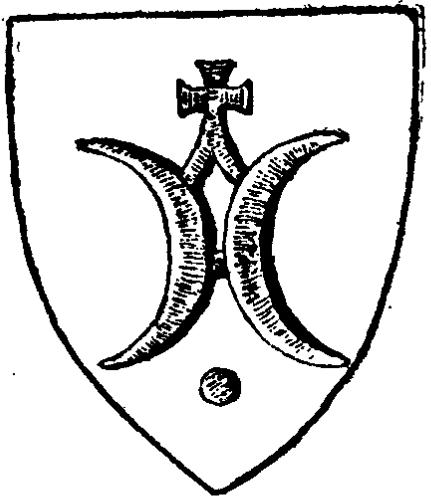
From the seal of Dobieslaw de Koszyce as of Nikolaus de Sciborzyce from 1232

== Similar coats ==
Those coat of arms as below are of noble families and linked en masse to Ostoja simply because the moon or the sword in the shield. The list of imaginary Ostoja coats of arms might be longer than here presented. There are also Russian families that were ennobled and given the coat of arms that also looked like Ostoja during the partition time and that some call Ostoja. It is also possible that coats of arms were painted with error during the nobility verification process in the time of partition.

Families that are members of the Clan of Ostoja:

Below, CoA from the left: Błyszczanowicz - ancient family noted in 1497, error in 1806 by Russian authorities in Kiev that painted the coat of arms in the wrong way. Miklaszewski – this family was adopted to the Clan of Ostoja in 1569 when the family received nobility. Supposed to sign original Ostoja coat of arms. Third from the left is Ochocki coat of arms that received nobility in 1683 and was adopted to the Clan of Ostoja and sign modern version of Ostoja with sword instead of a cross. Fourth from the left, Gawłowski family of ancient origin and with a coat of arms that is simple error of foreign authorities, supposed to be original version of Ostoja. Strzałkowski (Strzałka) family is of ancient origin, also here the coat of arms is modified during partition of the Commonwealth but here most probably family helped authorities to change their original coat of arms. Purpose or reason of that is not known. Finally the coat of arms of Nagorski family that received nobility in 1590 and was adopted to the Clan of Ostoja. Note that there is another family of Nagorski of Ostoja of ancient origin but it is almost impossible now to separate those families from each other.

Families that are not members of the Clan of Ostoja

Second row from the left: Bogorajski, received nobility in 1775 and a crown as a display of a baron rank, although they never have been barons; this incorrect depiction is here since no other paintings of the correct coat of arms are available yet. Next coat of arms is of Raczewski (Racięski) family that also received nobility in 1775. The coat of arms of Kleczewski family followed by Mokrzewski family that are not members of the clan but show similar coats of arms to Ostoja. Last four coats of arms in this row are of families Orda, Plat, Wasilewski and Druck – none of them are members of the Clan, coat of arms have been simply added to Ostoja and are called a variant of Ostoja coat of arms.

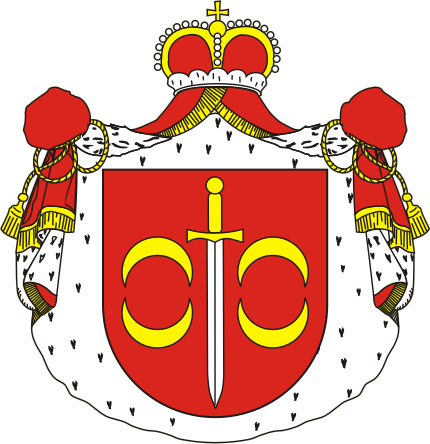

Third row from the left: coat of arms of Fincke von Finkenthal family that received nobility in 1805, followed by the coat of arms of the Ostaszewski family that received nobility in 1785, most probably the name is wrongly spelled, and should be Ostarzewski. The third coat of arms from the left is of Krall family that received nobility in 1768 followed by the coat of arms of the Szyszko family that should be not mixed up with the ancient Szyszkowski de Szyszki family. The coat of arms of the Turkuł family that received nobility in 1676, this family is extinct. The last three coats of arms in third row are of Wysocki, Przegonia and Cholewa families. None of the families have never been considered as members of the Clan of Ostoja but also here their coat of arms became recognized as a variant of the Ostoja coat of arms. In the case of Wysocki family, they belong to the Clan of Kolumna with a modified coat of arms called Kolumna ze skrzydlami - Kolumna with wings.

=== von Finkenstein coat of arms ===

Finally, below is the coat of arms of ancient German family von Finkenstein, also written as Fink von Finkenstein referring to the family of Fink that is noted in German records already in the 13th century. This family moved at that time to the land occupied by Teutonic Knights. In time this family became prominent.

It is not known who decided to call this coat of arms Ostoja Pruska but it is a significant example of breaking every possible heraldic rule in the name of Polish clan tradition where clan members used same coat of arms. It seems that this coat of arms was added to Ostoja almost by force. There are two families that where part of the Clan of Ostoja in the 14th century according to the records of Teutonic Knights, they lived in Pomerania and that have been given this coat of arms by all publications - the families of Lniski and Skrzyszewski vel Skrzeszewski. Here it is notable that the Skrzyszewski vel Skrzeszewski line in the 18th century suddenly changed their name to Lniski. It is not known if there is any blood relation between those families around the 14th century.

It is presumed that both families with roots dating back to the 14th century used the original Ostoja coat of arms and just because this family lived in Pomerania or Prussia, they have been given the coat of arms of the Finck family and called it "Ostoja Pruska".

== See also ==
- Clan of Ostoja
- Clan Ostoja (Moscics)
- Polish heraldry
- Heraldry
- Coat of arms
- Order of the Dragon
- Stibor of Stiboricz
- Jan z Jani
- Szlachta

== Sources ==
- Adam Boniecki: Herbarz polski. T. 16. Warszawa: skł. gł. Gebethner i Wolff, 1913
- Alfred Znamierowski: Herbarz rodowy. Warszawa: Świat Książki, ISBN 83-7391-166-9
- Tadeusz Gajl: Herbarz polski od średniowiecza do XX wieku, L&L, 2007, ISBN 978-83-60597-10-1
- Seweryn Uruski: Rodzina.Herbarz szlachty polskiej, Warszawa 1906
- Kasper Niesiecki: Herbarz polski, 1839–1846
- Jan Długosz: Jana Długosza kanonika krakowskiego Dziejów polskich ksiąg dwanaście, Kraków 1867-1870
- Józef Szymański: Herbarz rycerstwa polskiego z XVI wieku. Warszawa, ISBN 83-7181-217-5
- Andrzej Kulikowski: Wielki Herbarz Rodów Polskich. Warszawa: Świat Książki-Bertelsmann Media, 2005. ISBN 83-7391-523-0
- Medieval armorial: Gelre Armorial
- Medieval armorials: Armorial "Zlotego Runa", Armorial Lyncenich, Codex Bergshammar, "Klejnoty" of Jan Długosz, Armorial Bellenville
- Franciszek Piekosiński: Heraldyka polska wieków średnich. Kraków, Akademia Umiejętności 1899
