= Fyodor Lenkovich Kałłaur =

- Native name: Ѳеодоръ Ленковичъ Калауръ
- Born: c. 1475; Pinsk, Principality of Pinsk
- Died: c. 1567; Pinsk, Grand Duchy of Lithuania
- Noble family: Kałłaur
- Occupation: Bridge-master (mostovnichiy), district official (uryadnik)

Fyodor Lenkovich Kałłaur (бел. Фёдар Ленкавіч Калавур; c. 1475 – after 1567) was a statesman and landowner of the Principality of Pinsk within the Grand Duchy of Lithuania. He served as a bridge-master (mostovnichiy) and a district official (uryadnik) during the reigns of Prince Fyodor Ivanovich Yaroslavich (1501–1522) and Queen Bona Sforza (1522–1556).

== Origins ==
Fyodor descended from the boyar Kałłaur family of the Ostoja coat of arms. His father, Alexander (Lenko) Kałłaur, is mentioned in Fyodor's patronymic ("Lenkovich"), though direct records of Alexander's own activities have not yet been discovered in the surviving acts of the Pinsk Principality.

One hypothesis suggests the family originated from Podolia, where the Koriatovich princes founded the Kalaur Castle in the late 14th century. According to one theory, the family ancestor could be Nichko Karaulsky, who received lands in Podolia from King Władysław II Jagiełło in 1410. When Podolian lands were annexed by Poland in the 15th century, the Koriatovich family began appearing in Pinsk records alongside the Kałłaurs. Alternatively, it is suggested that the Kałłaurs were autochthonous to Pinsk. In the 1552 land registry (pistsovaya kniga), Fyodor was recorded as a resident of Pinsk living beyond the Trinity Bridge, where he owned 1.5 pruta of land.

== Biography ==
Kałłaur likely received his education at a school associated with the Leszczynski Monastery or the Pinsk Castle. He personally drafted legal acts, indicating a high level of literacy.

In a 1517 charter, Prince Fyodor Yaroslavich and Princess Helena arranged the marriage of, probably Fyodor's daughter, Ogrenka Kałłaur, to the boyar Benedikt Fursovich, granting her a dowry of five estates.

Kałłaur owned the ancestral estate of Nechatovo. In 1521, he sold a portion of these lands ("Litvinovskaya Land") to Arest Kigir, a subject of Queen Bona. In this act, Fyodor detailed his social and service obligations, which he performed with his own men: regional and military service, as well as castle-related duties. The latter included building defensive walls (parkany) and ditches for Pinsk Castle, and maintaining bridges across the Yaselda and Pina rivers on the road from Pinsk to Dubrovytsia.

== Military Service ==
In 1528, Fyodor Kałłaur was included in the Military Census as part of the mounted boyars of the Pinsk district. He likely participated in campaigns against the Crimean Tatars, notably the Battle on the Uzh River as part of the Pinsk militia in 1503.

The last mention of Fyodor is found in the 1567 military census. The document states that Kałłaur "is already very old and stayed at home, sending his son in his place with a horse and a pike."

== Family ==
He was married to Maria Kałłaur. He had two known sons:

- **Ivan**: served under Semyon Orda, an associate of Prince Konstanty Wasyl Ostrogski.
- **Dolmat**: mentioned in the 1567 military census.
