= Kałłaur family =

Family

Kałłaur
- Ostoja coat of arms
- Current region: Belarus
- Origin: Pinsk, Grand Duchy of Lithuania
- Estates: Neczatovo, Kałłaurowicze, Osowce, Wujwicze, Murowin

The Kałłа́ur family (Polish: Kałłaur; Belarusian: Калавур, Kalavur; Russian: Каллаур) is a szlachta family originating from the Grand Duchy of Lithuania.

== Origin ==
According to one version, the Kałłaur family derived its name from Kalaur Castle. In 1410, Jogaila granted Nyczko Karaulsky lands in Podolia. Historian Janusz Kurtyka suggests that Nyczko Karaulsky performed administrative functions at the castle. In 1411, Polish chronicler Jan Długosz mentioned Kalaur among the places visited by Jogaila. Kalaur was part of the Grand Duchy of Lithuania until the second half of the 15th century. From the 16th century onwards, the Kałłaur family began to hold state positions in the Principality of Pinsk.

Another theory posits that the family is of Tatar noble origin, settling in the Principality of Pinsk. This version was proposed by historian Roman Horoszkiewicz (1892–1962) in his book "List of Gentry Families of the Hinterland of Pinsk Land". This theory is based on the Turkic etymology of the word (Old Turkic karaul meaning guard). However, the word "kalavur" could also have Slavic origins.

== History ==
Pinsk boyar and official Chviedzka Lienkavič Kałaur is one of the first representatives of the family mentioned in written sources. Chviedzka Kałaur concluded a land-sale contract with a royal servant, Orest Kyhir, in 1521. In 1517 a deed of gift from the Pinsk's Duke Fyodar Yaraslavich documents the marriage of Ogrenka Kalavurovna, probably the Chviedzka's daughter, to Venedikt Fursovich, along with a dowry of 5 homesteads.

The members of the family took part in the Army census of the Grand Duchy of Lithuania in 1528-1567, which underlined their status. Chviedzka Lienkavič and Dzianis Korewulovič participated in the 1528 census as a mounted knights. Four members were numbered among the cavalry within the 1567 census: an officer of the court in Pinsk, Pronko Dzianisavič, Radko Siamionavič, Dałmat and Ivan.

Although Chviedzka Lienkavič was recorded as a property owner within the city of Pinsk itself between 1552 and 1555, the estate of Kałłaurowicze - likely granted to him for his service and where the branch of the family settled — was first mentioned in 1567.

The family played an important role in the region. For instance, Piotr Kałłaur was elected as a representative of the nobility of the uyezd of Pinsk in 1853. The members of the family supported the January Uprising in 1863–1864. The monument in honor of the rebels Vasil, Szymon Kallaur and Anton Šałamicky was opened near Pinsk in 1933.

Some members of the family were subjected to repression in the 1940-1950s. According to the open lists, 7 people were persecuted in the Pinsk Region of the Belarusian SSR.

== Notable people with surname Kałłaur ==
- Fyodor Lenkovich Kałłaur (c. 1475 – after 1567), statesman and landowner of the Principality of Pinsk within the Grand Duchy of Lithuania.
- Vasily Kallaur, 1843–1919, chief of Aulie-Ata uyezd, archaeologist and orientalist.
- Mikołaj Kałłaur, 1920-2017, Polish military person, diplomat and essayist.
- Pavel Kallaur, b. 1962, Belarusian economist and head of the National Bank of Belarus.
