= Vasily Kallaur =

- Василий Андреевич Каллаур
- Born: 6 February 1843; Minsk, Russian Empire
- Died: 1918 or 1919
- Known for: Discovery of the Talas inscriptions
- Scientific career
- Fields: Oriental studies, archaeology

Vasily Andreyevich Kallaur (Russian: Василий Андреевич Каллаур; 6 February 1843 – 1918/1919) was a Russian Imperial Orientalist and archaeologist known for his extensive research into Central Asia. He is most notable for the discovery of the Old Turkic runic monuments of the Talas Valley.

== Biography ==
Kallaur descended from the ancient Lithuanian noble Kałłaur family of the Ostoja coat of arms. He graduated from the Konstantinovsk Artillery School in Saint Petersburg. In 1867, he served as a second lieutenant in the 3rd Orenburg Line Battalion.

== Bibliography ==
- Lunin, B. V. (1958). From the History of Russian Oriental Studies and Archaeology in Turkestan. Tashkent.
