= Kondracki =

Ostoja coat of arms used by some of Kondracki family

Kondracki or Kondradzki (feminine: Kondracka or Kondradzka) is a Polish surname. Some of them use Janina, Ossorya, Ostoja or Prus coat of arms. It may be transliterated as Konradzki, Konracki, Kondratsky.

Notable people with the surname include:

- Bogdan Kondracki (born 1968), Polish musician, composer, vocalist, multi-instrumentalist and music producer
- Jerzy Kondracki (1908–1998), Polish geographer, professor at the University of Warsaw, author of the most famous physicogeographical regionalization of Poland
- Henry Kondracki (born 1953), Scottish artist
- Larysa Kondracki, Canadian filmmaker
- Michał Kondracki (1902–1984), Polish composer
- Wiesław Kondracki (1938 – 5 March 2024), Polish engineer, farmer, economist and politician, member of Sejm
- Witold Kondracki (1950–2015), Polish mathematician

== Other ==
- Kopa Kondracka, mountain in the Western Tatras
