= Szymon Kallaur =

Szymon Kałłaur
- Сямён Калавур
- Born: 1839; Pinsk uyezd, Minsk Governorate, Russian Empire
- Died: 15 March 1882 (aged 42–43); Przemyśl, Kingdom of Galicia and Lodomeria, Austria-Hungary
- Military career
- Allegiance: (Poland) National Government
- Rank: Captain
- Nickname: Smoleński
- Unit: Detachment of Romuald Traugutt
- Conflicts: January Uprising
- Other work: Civil engineer, entrepreneur

Szymon Kałłaur (Сямён Калавур; 1839 – 15 March 1882) was a participant in the January Uprising, a captain in the insurgent forces, and later a civil engineer and entrepreneur in Galicia.

== Biography ==
Szymon Kałłaur was born in 1839 into the noble Kałłaur family (of the Ostoja coat of arms) in Pinsk. He received his higher education at the Faculty of Physics and Mathematics of Saint Petersburg State University.

=== January Uprising and Exile ===
With the outbreak of the January Uprising in 1863, Kałłaur joined the insurgent forces. He served in the unit commanded by Romuald Traugutt, who later became the leader of the uprising. For his bravery and organizational skills, Kałłaur was promoted to the rank of Captain.

Following the defeat of the insurgent forces, he was captured on the battlefield and sentenced to exile in Siberia, where he spent six years. To avoid the permanent restrictions imposed on Russian subjects in exile, Kałłaur adopted the pseudonym Smoleński and claimed to be a subject of the Austrian Empire. The deception was successful; upon his release, he was allowed to legally depart for Galicia.

=== Life in Galicia ===
In emigration, he settled in Przemyśl, where he established himself as an engineer and entrepreneur. He specialized in the design and construction of public roads and infrastructure. Shortly before his death, he officially confirmed his Austrian citizenship and was formally inducted into the municipal community of Przemyśl.

Kałłaur died in Przemyśl on 15 March 1882.
