= Piotr Kałłaur =

Russian Imperial civil servant (1799–1896)

- Пётр Казимирович Каллаур
- Born: 1799
- Died: 1896 (aged 96–97); Pinsk, Minsk Governorate, Russian Empire
- Occupations: Judge, civil servant
- Known for: Judge of the Pinsk Uyezd Court
- Spouse: Konstancja Szczerba
- Children: 2 sons, including Tomasz Władysław

Piotr Kazimirowich Kałłaur (1799–1896) was a Russian Imperial civil servant and judge. He served as a judge of the Pinsk Uyezd Court and was a deputy of the nobility of Pinsk.

== Biography ==
Kałłaur was born into a noble family of the Kałłaur family (of the Ostoja coat of arms). In 1818, he graduated from the Pinsk Noble District School and entered civil service.

=== Judicial career ===
Throughout his career, Kałłaur held several prominent judicial and administrative positions in Pinsk:

- 1823–1832: Assessor of the Pinsk Lower District Court.
- 1832–1835: Boundary judge (*mezhovoy sudya*) of Pinsk.
- 1836–1850: Assessor of the Pinsk Uyezd Court.
- 1853–1856: Elected deputy of the nobility of the Minsk Governorate representing the Pinsk Uyezd.
- 1856–1863: Judge of the Pinsk Uyezd Court.

On 26 April 1863, during the January Uprising, Kallaur resigned from his post as a sign of solidarity with the insurgents. Following his retirement, he lived at his estate in Osowce, where he owned 63 male serfs prior to the Emancipation reform of 1861.

=== Personal life ===
He was married to Konstancja Szczerba (born 1816). The couple had two sons: Tomasz Władysław (born 1848) and Roman (born 1851).

== Osowce Estate ==
According to land records from 1908, a portion of the Osovtsy estate belonging to his son, Tomasz Władysław Kałłaur, was transferred to local peasants. By the 1910s, the remaining land was sold. Ethnographic accounts suggest that the Kallaur family was primarily Polish-speaking in their private life.

The history of the manor ended tragically: after the land was sold, a local resident set fire to the manor house. The fire resulted in the deaths of the owner's wife, two children, and a servant. During the Soviet period, a collective farm (kolkhoz) yard was built on the site of the former estate.
