= Marchocki family with Ostoja coat of arms =

Polish medieval CoA Ostoja

Marchocki of the Ostoja coat of arms was a Polish senatorial noble family.

== Bibliography ==
- Kasper Niesiecki, Herbarz Polski, t.6, Lipsk 1841, s. 343–344.
- Seweryn Uruski, Rodzina, Herbarz szlachty polskiej, t.10, Warszawa 1913 s. 207–210.
- Urzędnicy województwa sandomierskiego XVI-XVIII wieku. Spisy, oprac. Krzysztof Chłapowski i Alicja Falniowska-Grabowska, Kórnik 1993, s. 196.
- Urzędnicy województwa ruskiego XIV-XVIII wieku. (Ziemie halicka, lwowska, przemyska, sanocka). Spisy, oprac. Kazimierz Przyboś. 1987, s. 364.
- Na Kresach i za Kresami. Wspomnienia i szkice, tom II, Kijów 1914.
- Antoni Rolle, Hrabia Redux, [w:] Wybór pism, tom II, Kraków 1966.
- Wawrzyniec Marczyński, Statystyczne, topograficzne i historyczne opisanie guberni podolskiej, tom I-III, Wilno 1820–1823.
- Teresa od Jezusa, Autobiografia mistyczna i inne pisma, Wydawnictwo Karmelitów Bosych, Kraków 2010.
- Krzysztof Chłapowski, Starostowie niegrodowi w Koronie 1565-1795 Materiały źródłowe, Warszawa 2017.
