= Marchocki =

Marchocki (feminine: Marchocka; plural: Marchoccy) is a Polish surname. Notable people with this surname include:

- Anna Maria Marchocka (1603–1652), Polish writer and Roman Catholic nun
- Ignacy Ścibor Marchocki (1755–1827), Polish nobleman
