= Chrostowski =

Chrostowski (feminine: Chrostowska, plural: Chrostowscy) is a Polish surname. It may refer to:

- Alfons Mieczysław Chrostowski (c. 1860 – after 1920), Polish writer
- Brandon Chrostowski, American restaurateur and politician
- Grażyna Chrostowska (1921–1942), Polish poet and activist
- Halina Chrostowska (1929–1990), Polish visual artist
- S. D. Chrostowska, Canadian-American writer
- Stanisław Ostoja-Chrostowski (1900–1947), Polish artist
- Tadeusz Chrostowski (1878–1923), Polish naturalist
- Waldemar Chrostowski (born 1951), Polish Catholic priest
