= Janina coat of arms =

Polish coat of arms

Janina
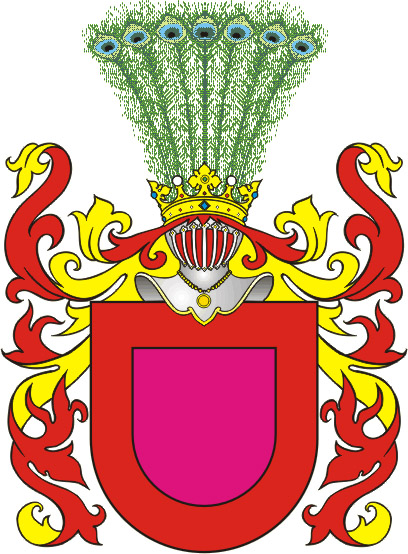
- Battle cry: Janina
- Alternative names: Clipeus in Clipeum, Szczyt w Szczycie, Tarcza w Tarczy, Pole w Polu
- Earliest mention: 1379 (seal)
- Cities: Złoczów
- Divisions: Wilanów, Scutum
- Families: 276 names A Antoniewicz, Antonowicz. B Białobłocki, Białobocki, Białobrocki, Białobrodzki, Białowocki, Białowodzki, Bidzieński, Bidziński, Biedzieński, Bielecki, Bielewski, Bielicki, Bielowski, Brandwicki, Branicki, Branwicki, Brodawka, Broniszewski, Broniszowski, Byszewski. C Chołubowicz, Chotecki, Chotelski, Churzowski, Chyszowski, Cudzinowski, Czudzinowski, Czyżowski. D Danczykiewicz, Danejkowicz, Denejkowicz, Doruchowski, Duńczykiewicz, Dzirytowicz. F Falisławski. G Gabaniski, Gabański, Gaboński, Gabriałowicz, Gabryałowicz, Gabryjałowicz, Gajewski, Gajle, Galowski, Gardziński, Gawędowski, Giecewicz, Gielczewski, Giełbowski, Giełczewski, Gołembiowski, Gołębiowski, Gołubicki, Gołubiecki, Gołubiew, Gołubowski, Górka, Grabowski, Guliński. H Hanicki, Hołubicki, Hołubowicz, Hołubowski, Hubarewicz. I Imszennik, Iwanin. J Jachniewicz, Jacuński, Janiewicz, Jasniewicz, Janik, Janikowicz, Janikowski, Janiński, Jankiewicz, Janowicz, Janowiecki, Janowski, Jarociński, Jaroszewski, Jaroszowski, Jaroszyński, Jasiński, Jaszczowski, Jawicki, Jaworski, Jentkiewicz, Jętkiewicz, Jowenko, Jurkiewicz. K Kamiński, Kański, Karski, Kasperowicz, Kaszewski, Kaszowski, Kielczewski, Kiełbowski, Kiełczewski, Kleofas, Kliszowski, Klofas, Kołaczkowski, Kołaczyński, Kołmaczewski, Konracki, Konradzki, Korzeniewski, Korzeniowski, Krampski, Kraski, Krzysztoforski, Krzysztoporski, Kufiński, Kułaczkowski, Kunradzki, Kuszczewski, Kwasek, Kwasibrodzki. L Lachowski, Lendzki, Leński, Lęcki, Lędzki, Liński, Lipnicki, Lipski, Lubecki. Ł Łabęcki, Łabędzki, Łęcki, Łędzki, Łęski. M Maciejewski, Maciejowski, Malski, Mietelski, Mikołajewicz, Milęcki, Miroszowski, Mniowski, Mociewicz, Morozowski, Mszczuj . N Nacewicz, Naczewicz, Narajewski, Narajowski, Narojski, Nasiechowski, Necewicz, Neczewicz, Nepelski, Nieciewicz, Nossek. O Olbęcki, Olbiecki, Olbieński, Olbięcki, Olbiński, Olszbank, Onikiewicz, Opalski, Opocki, Opoka. P Pankowski, Pełka, Piasecki, Pielaszkowski, Podlodowski, Pogłodowski, Polikarp, Potocki, Prawęcki, Przewocki, Przezwocki, Pszonka, Pszonkowski, Putianowicz, Putyanowicz, Pyrka, Pyrski. R Radorzyski, Raduński, Rdzawski, Restarzewski, Rzeczycki, Rzezeński, Rzeżeński. S Sadło, Sadowski, Sawin, Smosarski, Smoszarski, Sobieski, Sopocki, Sopotnicki, Srokowski, Starzyński, Stoiński, Stojecki, Stojeński, Stojeski, Stojewski, Strojewski, Stroński, Suchodolski, Swoboda, Swojkowski, Szczepiecki, Szczypiecki, Szczypski. Ś Świder, Świerczkowski, Święcicki. T Tarnawski, Tchorzewski, Tchórzewski, Tchórzowski, Trymowicz, Tudorowski, Turski. U Ubniński, Unieszowski, Uniszowski, Urniaż, Urzanowski, Urzarzowski, Urzażowski, Usarzewski, Uszacki, Uzarzowski. W Warpęski, Wasilenko, Wasylenko, Waszmuntowski, Weszmunt, Wierciński, Wiernek, Wiernkowski, Wierzbieński, Wierzbięta, Wierzbiński, Wierzynek, Winarski, Winiarski, Włostowski-Pełka, Wojsin, Wojszyk, Wojszym, Wojszyn, Wojtkiewicz, Wolicki, Wrzazowski, Wrzębski, Wszemuntowski, Wydżga, Wysociński, Wyszmuntowski. Z Zacharewicz, Zachwatowicz, Zaduski, Zahutyński, Zawadzicki, Zawadzki, Zawieprski, Zbiluta, Zerzyński, Zielawski, Zulicki, Zyrzyński. Ż Żulicki, Żyliński, Żyrzyński.

Janina is a Polish nobility clan coat-of-arms. Borne by several noble families descended in the-male line from the medieval lords of Janina (the eponyms of the clan) or legally adopted into the clan upon ennoblement.

== History ==
Janina is the only coat of arms represented on the sky as constellation – Scutum. It was created by Johannes Hevelius in 1684, and originally named it Scutum Sobiescianum (the shield of Sobieski) to commemorate the victory of the Polish forces led by King John III Sobieski in the Battle of Vienna in 1683. Later, the name was shortened to Scutum.

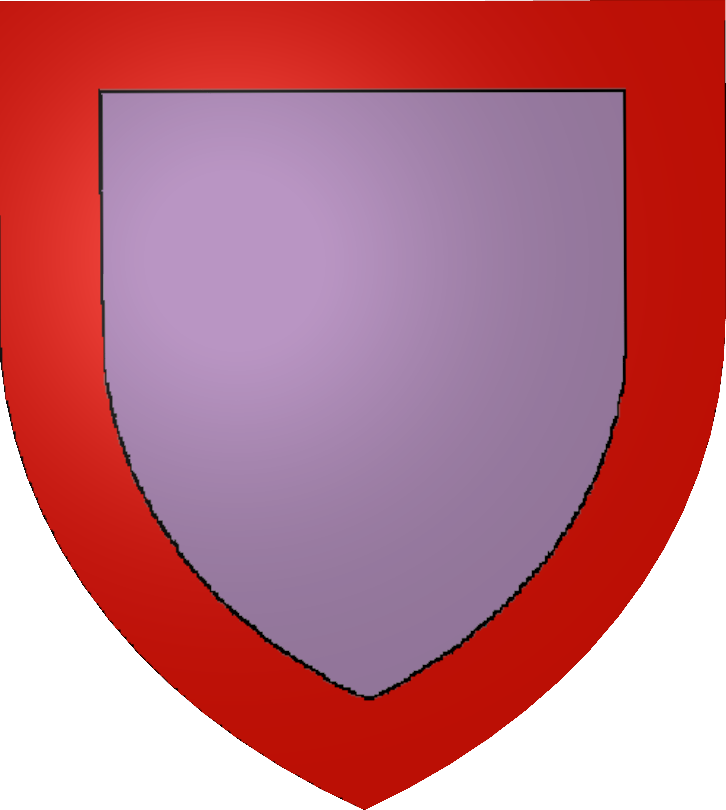

== Blazon ==
The coat of arms was used in a variety of tinctures and designs, varying greatly from family to family. All of them depicted what is described in the alternative names for the Janina, that is a "field in a field" or a "shield within a shield".

== Notable bearers ==
Most notable bearers of this coat of arms include:

- members of the Sobieski family, including King Jan III Sobieski and Katarzyna Sobieska (pictured)

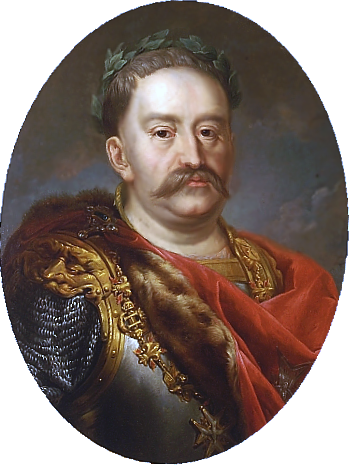
Jan III Sobieski

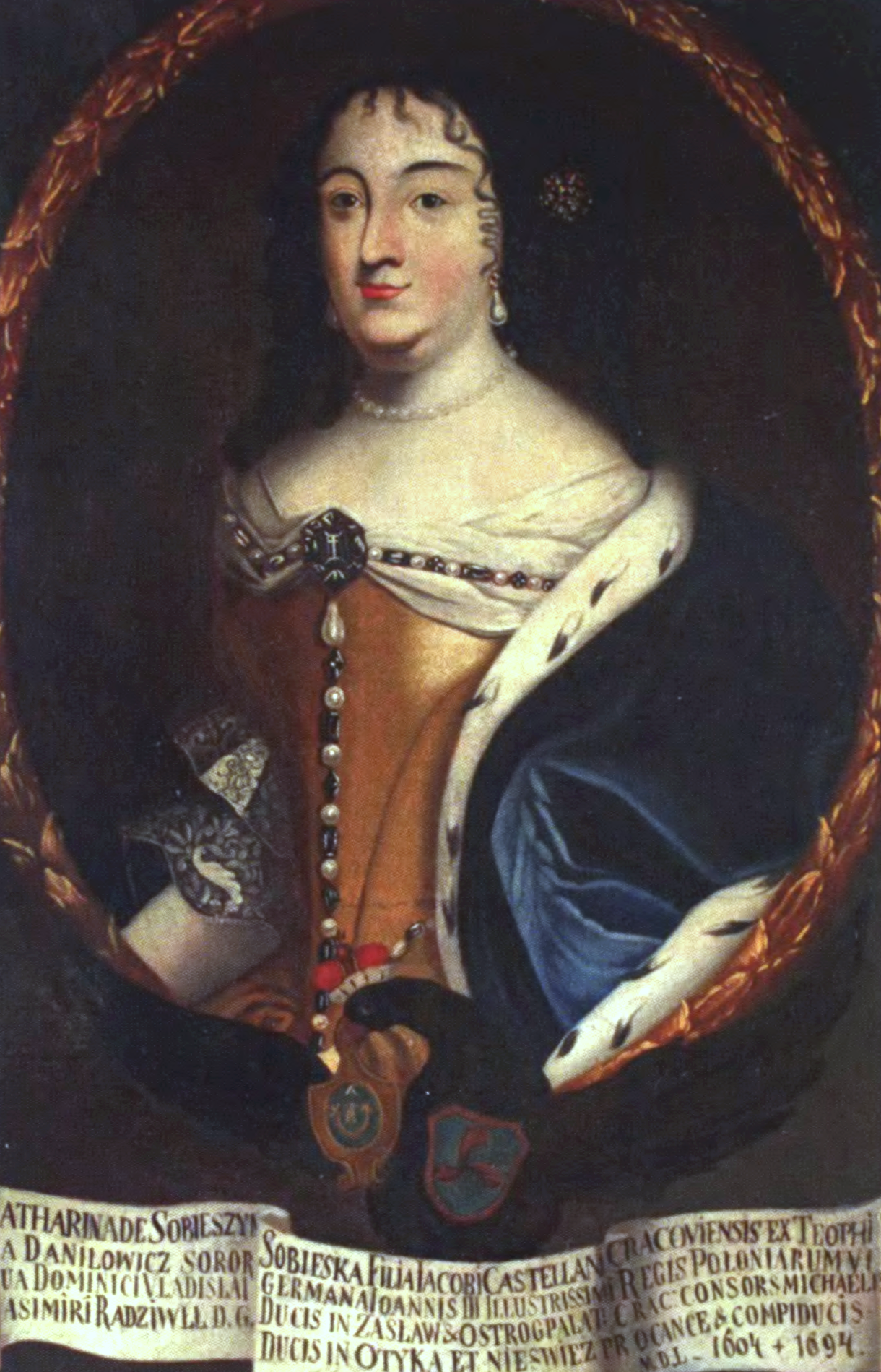
Katarzyna Sobieska

== Gallery ==
Variations

Coat of arms of Jan III Sobieski as the King of Poland

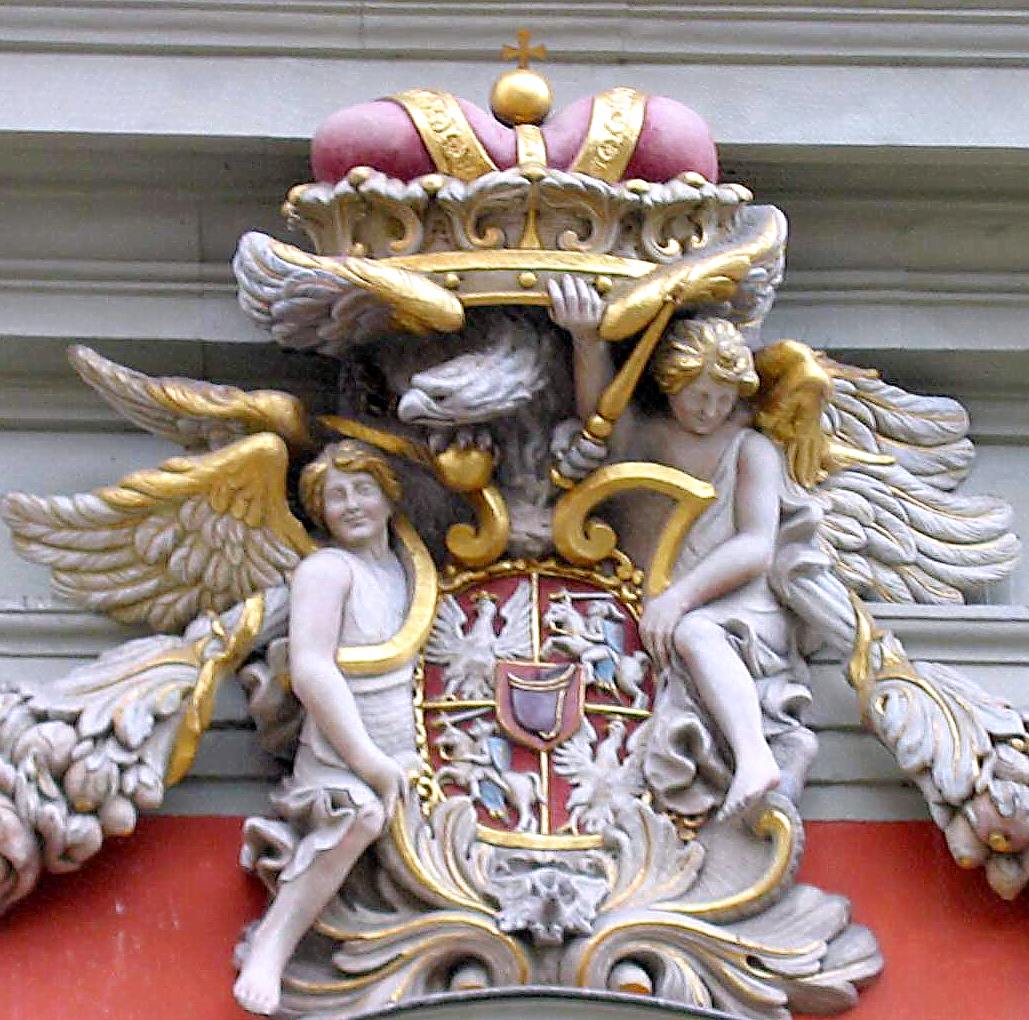
Portrayal of Sobieski's royal crown, Gdańsk.

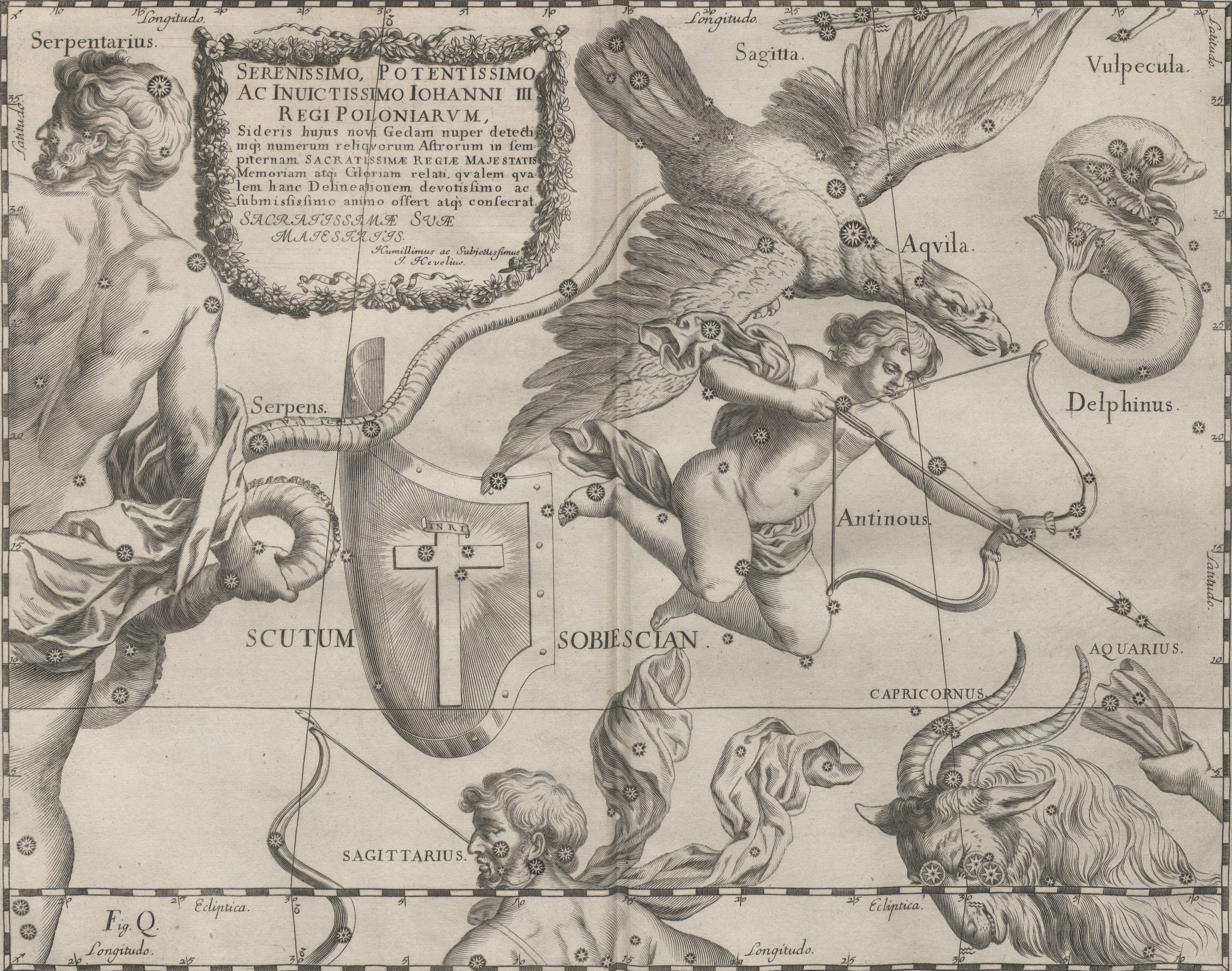
Scutum Sobiescianum- Johannes Hevelius drew the constellation in Uranographia, his celestial catalogue in 1690.

Variation of Janina

Warepski vel Warępski, variation of Janina

Chunowski, variation of Janina

Jurgielewicz, variation of Janina

Axt, a Silesian coat of arms, variation of Janina according to Alfred Znamierowski

Zgraja, variation of Janina

Cities and Villages

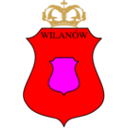
Coat of arms of Wilanów District in Warsaw

== Bibliography ==
- Tadeusz Gajl: Herbarz polski od średniowiecza do XX wieku : ponad 4500 herbów szlacheckich 37 tysięcy nazwisk 55 tysięcy rodów. L&L, 2007, s. 406–539. ISBN 978-83-60597-10-1.

== See also ==
- Scutum (constellation)
- Polish heraldry
- Heraldic family
- List of Polish nobility coats of arms
