= Prus coat of arms =

Polish coat of arms

Prus I
- Battle cry: Turzyna, Wiskała
- Alternative names: Połtora Krzyża, Turzyna, Wiskawa, Wiszczała
- Earliest mention: 13th century (as old Prussian nobility); October 1, 1345 (as Polish clan)
- Families: 391 names altogether: A Albrychowicz, Andrzejewski, Andrzejowski, Augustowski. B Baldowski, Bałdowski, Basowicz, Bednarowski, Bednarski, Bednawski, Bereźnicki, Białochowski, Białyszewski, Biesiadecki, Biestrzykowski, Bluszczyński, Błoński, Bodusławski, Bogdański, Bogurski, Bogusławski, Bolanczski, Boniecki, Bońkowski, Borowski, Brodacki, Brzeński, Bugajski, Bugayski, Butwił, Butwiłowicz, Bysbram, Bystroń. C Chladowski, Chocewicz, Chodaszewicz, Chomentowski, Chomętowski, Chrzanowski, Chwałkowski, Cianowski, Ciągliński, Cieszym, Cieszymowski, Cygański, Cytowicz, Czaczkowski v. Cackowski. D Dąbrowski, Długojewski, Długojowski, Dobrocieski, Dorohiński, Drogot, Drotkiewicz, Drozdowski, Druszkowski, Durzycki, Dymitrowski, Dzierliński, Dzierżek. F Fastowicz, Faszcza, Faszczewski, Frankowski, Frycowski. G Gałecki, Garlicki, Gawłowicki, Gębicki, Gladowicki, Głąb, Gładowski, Głowacki, Głuchowski, Gniewiewski, Gnowski, Gonowski, Gorny, Gostyński, Goworowski, Grabkowski, Groblewski, Grochowalski, Grot, Grzybowski, Grzymisławski, Guda, Gumowski, Gunicki, Gurkowski. H Hladowicki, Hołówko, Hurba, Hurkowski I Isajkowski. J Jabłonowski, Jabłoszewski, Janowski, Jaras, Jarnutowski, Jaroszewicz, Jaszczewski, Jerzowski, Jezierski, Jeżowski, Juchna, Juchnowski, Julewski, Jurecki. K Kaczkowski, Kączkowski, Kamiński, Kełpsz, Kierdanowski, Kierdwanowski, Klecki, Klicki, Kliczkowski, Kliks, Klobar, Kobierski, Kobieski, Kobyliński, Kodziełł, Kołomyjski, Kondracki, Korcicki, Korczewski, Kordek, Korgowd, Korowicki v. Kurowicki, Korulski, Korycki, Kostecki, Kowieski, Kowalowski, Koźliński, Krasnosielski, Krasnowiecki, Krępiński v. Krępski, Krzyszkowski, Krzywokolski, Krzywokulski, Krzyżakowski, Krzyżankowski, Krzyżewski, Kumelski, Kurczyński, Kwaczyński. L Lisicki, Lisiecki. Ł Łaszkowski, Łaś, Łatkiewicz, Łatkowicz, Łatyński, Łaźniewski, Łącki, Łątkiewicz, Łososiński. M Maciński, Manowski, Markold, Michalczewski, Michalewicz, Mierzwiński, Miłkowski, Miński, Miszkiel, Mitkiewicz, Mitkowicz, Młyński, Mniszewski, Mocarski, Mokrzewski, Monastyrski, Morelowski, Motowidło, Mroczek, Mroczkowski, Mrozowski, Mruk, Mścichowski, Myk, Myck. N Nadolski, Nakwaski, Napierkowski, Napiórkowski, Nejman, Niedzielski, Nidziński, Nielepiec, Nielipowicz, Niemczynowicz, Niemczynowski, Niewiadomski z odm., Noniewicz, Noreyko, Nowakowski, Nossakowski. O Obrycki, Obrzycki, Ogilba, Ogrodzieński, Ogrodziński, Olszewski, Olszowski z Olszowy, Opacki, Opolski, Opalenicki, Opaleniecki, Orło, Ormieński, Ormiński, Orzeł, Orzyłowski, Orzełowski, Ossowski, Ostrowski, Otocki, Otto. P Pajewski, Padkowski, Pakosz, Patkowski, Patocki, Pecner, Petrulewicz, Petrusiewicz, Petryczyn, Pielgrzymowski, Pietrusewicz, Pikuz, Pilski, Piotrowski, Piszczatowski, Plewiński, Płoniański, Płonka, Płonowski, Płoński, Płoski, Płowski, Pogorzelski, Polikowski, Połomski, Polkowski, Porembiński, Porębiński, Potoczyński, Prus, Prusewicz, Prusiecki, Pruski, Pruss, Pruś, Pruszanowski, Pruszewski, Przechadzki, Przechocki, Przechowski, Przewłocki, Przewski, Przezdziecki, Przeździecki, Puryszka, Puryszko, Puzyrowicz. R Raciborowski, Raczkowski, Radecki, Radomiński, Radwański, Radziątkowski, Radziecki, Raszpiński, Reszkowski, Reymer, Robkowski, Rodowicz, Rodzianko, Rokotowski, Rosochacki, Rosołowski, Rożanka, Różanka, Rudobielski, Rudowski, Rudnicki, Rudziński, Ruwski, Rzeczkowski, Rzeszek. S Sas, Siedlecki, Skarga, Skarzeszowski, Skomorowski, Skowron, Skrodzki, Sławek, Słubic, Słubicki, Smolikowski, Smorawski, Snarowski, Sobiecki, Sochaczewski, Spinecki, Spinek, Stelągowski v. Stelęgowski, Stępkowski, Stradomski, Strząłkowski, Strowski, Strzelecki, Strzempieński, Strzempiński, Studziński, Stypiński, Suszewski, Szamowski, Szczepanowski, Szepczyński, Szepeciński, Szepeczyński, Szmorawski, Szpinek, Szumanczowski, Szumańczewski, Szumańczowski, Szybalski, Szymanczewski. Ś Ślepczyc, Ślepikowski, Ślepkowski, Świder, Świerczkowski, Świętochowski T Tabaszewski, Tabaszowski, Tobaszowski, Tolstecki, Tołstecki, Trembecki, Trembicki, Trębicki, Truskawski, Turkowski, Turzyński. U Urbanowski. W Werecki, Wieczffiński, Wierzbicki, Wierzbięta, Wiewiorowski, Więckowski, Wilkoszowski, Windyk alias Wittyg, Wiszniewski, Wiszniowski, Wiśniewski, Wiśniowski, Wittyg, Wokulski, Wołkowiński, Wołowski, Wolski, Wrocz, Wrotnowski, Wrzępski Wysłobocki. Z Zadzimirski, Zagorowski, Zajączkowski, Zajączek, Zajkowski, Zalęski, Załęski, Załęski Ślubicz, Zarapaty, Zbierzyński, Zbirzyński, Zdrodowski, Zegadło, Zglenicki, Zglinicki, Zieliński, Zorakowski. Ż Żabka, Żukowski.

Prus I is a Polish coat of arms. It was used by a number of szlachta (noble) families under the Polish–Lithuanian Commonwealth.

== History ==
According to genealogist Łukasz Ćwikła from the University of Łódź, the Prus were a heraldic clan that, alongside Prus II and Prus III, were old Prussian refugees fleeing the Teutonic conquest of Prussia. These refugees clung to Old Prussian traditions, and, unlike other Polish clans, had stratified nobiles and ignobiles tiers to nobility. The Old Prussians as a whole settled in Mazovia, with a significant final refugee movement following the Prussian uprisings in the 1260s and 1270s as the Teutonic order eradicated the Old Prussians and resettled the land with Germans.

Two Old Prussian nobiles princes are tied to the three Prus coat of arms, Windyka and Obizor, who fled to Mazovia around 1270. On October 1, 1345, Mazovian co-dukes Siemowit III and Casimir I issued a privilege to specifically named legitimate successors of Windyka and Obizor to answer only to the duke, and no ordinary provincial officials. This marked the legal recognition of pre-existing old Prussian nobility into the Polish clan and later the nobility system.

For Prus I, the first written mention comes in 1389 when the two respective princes' families were officially proclaimed as a clan alongside the Turzyna. Like the Turzyna, the Prus I also prominently featured a curvatura on their coat of arms. The Turzyna quickly disappeared from record, leading to Ćwikła to conclude they were likely absorbed into the Prus I. Two early Prus I proclamations were the Waga and Wiskała, with Wiskała being a corruption of the old-Prussian word viskalla, "moss", while Waga is a Jatvingian personal name. A third proclamation includes the Słubice, who were also claimed by Prus II.

By the 15th century the family quickly fragmented, with Prus II being declared in 1405, and Prus III in 1413. At their peak the combined Prus families owned 5.7% of noble landed holdings in Mazovia.

== Blazon ==
The Prus blazon is:

Gules, a patriarchal cross Argent, the sinister half of the lower traverse omitted.

The Prus coat of arms prominently features a one-and-a-half cross, a distinctly old-Prussian symbol. By the time of the old-Prussian uprisings, many of the old-Prussians had become Christian. The one-and-a-half cross was used by Christian old-Prussians to distinguish themselves from pagan old-Prussians.

At one point the arms also included a curvatura, another distinctly old-Prussian symbol that was later misinterpreted by the family in the late medieval period as the crozier of St Stanislaus, which the family tried to claim as an ancestor, even though the old Prussian immigration postdates him. The curvatura is a depiction of a kriwula, a staff of religious authority among the pagan old-Prussians and primarily associated with the Turzyna.

== Notable bearers ==
Notable bearers of this coat of arms have included:

- Bolesław Prus (Aleksander Głowacki)
- Eligiusz Niewiadomski
- Waclaw Szybalski
- Stanislaw Klicki

== See also ==
- Heraldry
- List of Polish nobility coats of arms

== Sources ==
- Dynastic Genealogy
- Ornatowski.com
- Wittyg, Wiktor: Nieznana szlachta polska i jej herby
