= Podgórski =

Podgórski is a Polish surname. Notable people with the surname include:

- Podgórski sisters, Stephania and Helena
- Anthony Podgorski (1903–1987), American businessman and politician
- Pete Podgorski (born 1953), American boxer and boxing official
- Stanisław Podgórski (1905–1981), Polish cyclist
- Tomasz Podgórski (born 1985), Polish footballer
- Łukasz Podgórski (born 2006), Polish dancer
