= Ignacy Ścibor Marchocki =

Ostoja

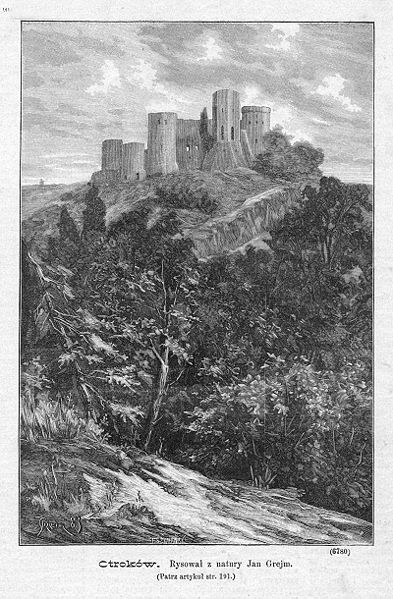
Otrokov, Castle of Scibor-Marchocki family

Ignacy Ścibor Marchocki (1755–1827) of the Clan of Ostoja was a Polish noble, famous in the first quarter of the nineteenth century. Ścibor Marchocki proclaimed his estates in Podolia as an independent state and installed pillars on its borders with name plates that identified that this was “The border of Minkowce state”. He was a benefactor for his peasants; he liberated them from serfdom and was concerned about their household improvement. His eccentricity, especially the introduction of pagan feasts, drew attention and Marchocki was convicted and imprisoned.

== Early life ==
Ignacy Ścibor Marchocki was born into a noble family that was part of the Clan of Ostoja. His father, Michał Ścibor Marchocki, died when his son was still little and so Ignacy was raised by his uncle Wojciech who did his best to provide for the boy's education. Much of the property of the family was supposed to be passed to Ignacy. However, due to the eccentric character of both Ignacy and his uncle, passing over the estate took much more time than expected.

He was sent by Wojciech to join the Prussian Army in order to train the character of Ignacy, hard terms implemented by the uncle taking the risk of Ignacy being killed in the war. Surviving hard time in Prussian army, Ignacy came back home from this expedition with character made of steel. However, as both had strong will, conflict between them arose and Ignacy left the Minkowce estates. During his time in the Prussian army, Ignacy learned several languages including French and German; he was also studying Roman law, literature and mythology.

As Ingacy left for Warsaw, he continued his military career and reached the rank of Major. His efforts were recognized and on his suggestion, his uncle was nominated for the Order of Saint Stanislaus that he received it in 1790. In the end Wojciech died prematurely and Ignacy could enter the estate as the new landlord.

== Minkowce State ==
The Minkowce State was far more progressive than any other constitution or model in Poland or Russia. The first thing Ścibor Marchocki did was to set up border pillars in 1793 that declared the Minkowce State surrounding the area of one town and eighteen villages. It was at the time when the area of Podole became Russian territory following the partitions of the Polish–Lithuanian Commonwealth. There were around 4,200 people living in the new created state. He liberated the serfs and gave all the people same rights, no matter of any origin or religion. Jews had exactly same rights as other citizens had. The central body of the state was the County Court as well as Court of Appeal. The main thing in the state was to give all citizens equal legal rights.

The estate had its own paper production and thus Ścibor Marchocki also printed the law of the state for everyone to read. He furthermore sent information about the state all around but all this have been burned down by Russian authorities. Furthermore, there was several different kind of article production since all citizens could produce whatever they wanted, there were cloths production and some oil production as well. The only thing citizens had to pay was the rent of the places they were living in and of course for local when producing.

There was a hospital, there were doctors that, specially during the time of plague, there were schools for children and Marchocki planned to open a university on his estates. The social care extremely well organized and the state flourished. Other noble families could not avoid what happened specially because Marchocki showed his economic model. Very soon he bought more land in order to expand his state.

Inside the Minkowce State, Ścibor Marchocki built beautiful gardens with sculptures; he also built four castles, one for each season of the year.

Toga

In summertime, Ścibor Marchocki, called Dux et Redux, was often seen wearing a Roman toga on his estates, something nobody saw as something strange.

=== End of the state ===
According to the sources: "The difference between living inside the Minkowce State and outside the same was like comparing heaven and hell. As Ścibor Marchocki was printing documents and posters, those have been delivered widely outside his estates. Such actions were of course not popular among the nobility that considered their serfs as something they, like a furniture. Killing a serf at that time within Russian borders could at most cause financial penalty that nobility did not pay anyway".

Reports about the Minkowce State and the activity outside the State reached the Russian side but in the beginning Russians were just stunned by the situation. They could not believe that there could be such a madness as the Minkowce State. Russian side wanted to prove that living in Russia was much better than in Poland and Ścibor Marchocki was the one that really wanted to show that happen. However, Russian side did react about all this information that Ścibor Marchocki spread around outside his possession. This was not considered as funny so they decided to burn down all of it so the plague would not spread to all over the Empire but they could not do much more according to the law. The law clearly stated that the landlord had free hands to do whatever he liked inside his property. The Russian side had no evidence of violation of the law and therefore did nothing more in the beginning. Ścibor Marchocki paid his taxes and he was a citizen of the Empire.

The information about the Minkowce State did however spread around and he was the subject of discussion all around in former Polish–Lithuanian Commonwealth. Specially because the State prospered and showed exceptional benefits to the owner. Russian side was not fond of this at all. They seized the danger of what was happening in the Minkowce State since this could cause the way to revolution inside the Empire and so they had to act. There were already printed publications about the Ścibor Marchocki and his State, one of the most famous is the play of Juliusz Słowacki in 1832 called "King of Ladawa".

The Russian side closed down the Minkowce State and imprisoned Ścibor Marchocki for conspiracy against the Russian Empire but the fame and the memory about Scibor-Marchocki and his state live in several publications. In the end, several landlords reconsidered their management of their estates and in the end of the century most people in Podolian Voivodeship and Volhynia lived good life on their estates living in harmony with the Landlords - thanks to the humanistic movement of Ignacy Scibor-Marchocki. He succeeded to run Minkowce state for about 30 years.

== See also ==
- Clan of Ostoja
- Ostoja Coat of Arms
- Stibor of Stiboricz
