= Mokrzecki =

Mokrzecki (feminine Mokrzecka) is a Polish surname. Notable people with the surname include:

- Stefan Mokrzecki (1862–1932), army officer
- Zygmunt Mokrzecki (1865–1936), entomologist
