= Zgraja coat of arms =

Polish–Lithuanian coat of arms

Zgraja
- Alternative names: Kunraczyc, Janina
- Earliest mention: 1384 - 1386
- Families: 5 names altogether: Gniewski, Gromek, Kanimir, Zgraja, Zieleniewski

Zgraja (Kunraczyc), a variant of the Janina coat of arms, is a Polish coat of arms. It was used by several szlachta (noble) families under the Polish–Lithuanian Commonwealth.

== Blazon ==
Crest: three ostrich plumes

== Notable bearers ==
Notable bearers of this coat of arms have included:

== See also ==
- Polish heraldry
- Heraldry
- Coat of arms
- Ornatowski.com
- Dynastic Genealogy
