= Michał Kondracki =

Polish composer (1902–1984)

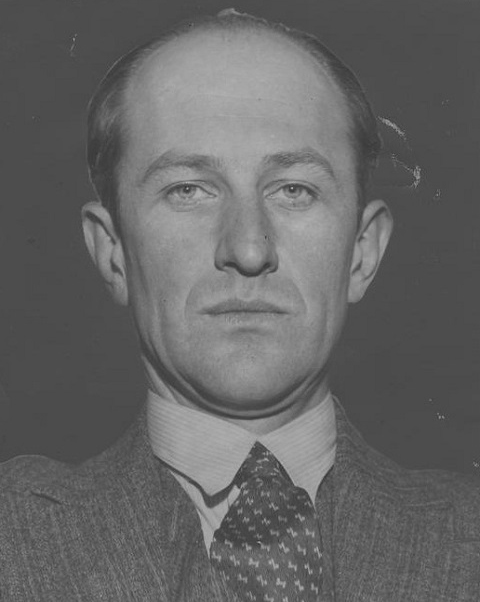
- Born: 5 October 1902; Poltava, Russian Empire
- Died: 27 February 1984 (aged 81); Glen Cove, New York, United States
- Occupation: Composer

Michał Kondracki (5 October 1902 – 27 February 1984) was a Polish composer. His work was part of the music event in the art competition at the 1932 Summer Olympics. Michał Kondracki was born on October 5, 1902 in Poltava, and died on 27 February 1984 in Glen Cove (near New York), Polish composer. In the years 1923-27 he studied at the conservatory in Warsaw with R. Statkowski and K. Szymanowski (composition) and H. Melcer (piano). In 1927-30 he studied at the Ecole Normale de Musique in Paris with P. Dukas, P. Vidal and N. Boulanger; he was also secretary of the Association of Young Polish Musicians in Paris. After returning to Warsaw he occupied himself with composing, music criticism and journalism, and charitable activities. Kondracki was co-organizer and vice president of the Polish Society for Contemporary Music, vice-president of the Association of Writers and Music Critics, a member of the artistic advisory board of the Warsaw Opera and board member of: the Society of Friends of Artistic Dance Society and the K. Szymanowski Society. He also collected folk music of the Hucul, Podhale and Żywiec regions. The outbreak of war in 1939 found him in the Mediterranean. In 1940 he arrived in Brazil and lived in Rio de Janeiro, where he worked with the radio station. In October 1943 he moved to the United States and lived in New York, later settling in Sea Cliff, New York, where he taught piano privately. He also worked with the TV Voice of America, where he conducted interviews with Polish artists performing in the United States. He was president of The Long Island Little Orchestra Society. In 1948-49 and 1957-69 was a correspondent for "Ruch Muzyczny". In 1960 he moved to Glen Cove, where he lived until his death. Michał Kondracki was a passionate traveler and a great lover of nature and these qualities to a large extent shaped his life in exile.

He had a double-barrelled surname, with the cognomen 'Ostoya', which, however, he never used.
