= Kałłaurowicze =

Kałłaurowicze Калавуравічы
- Village
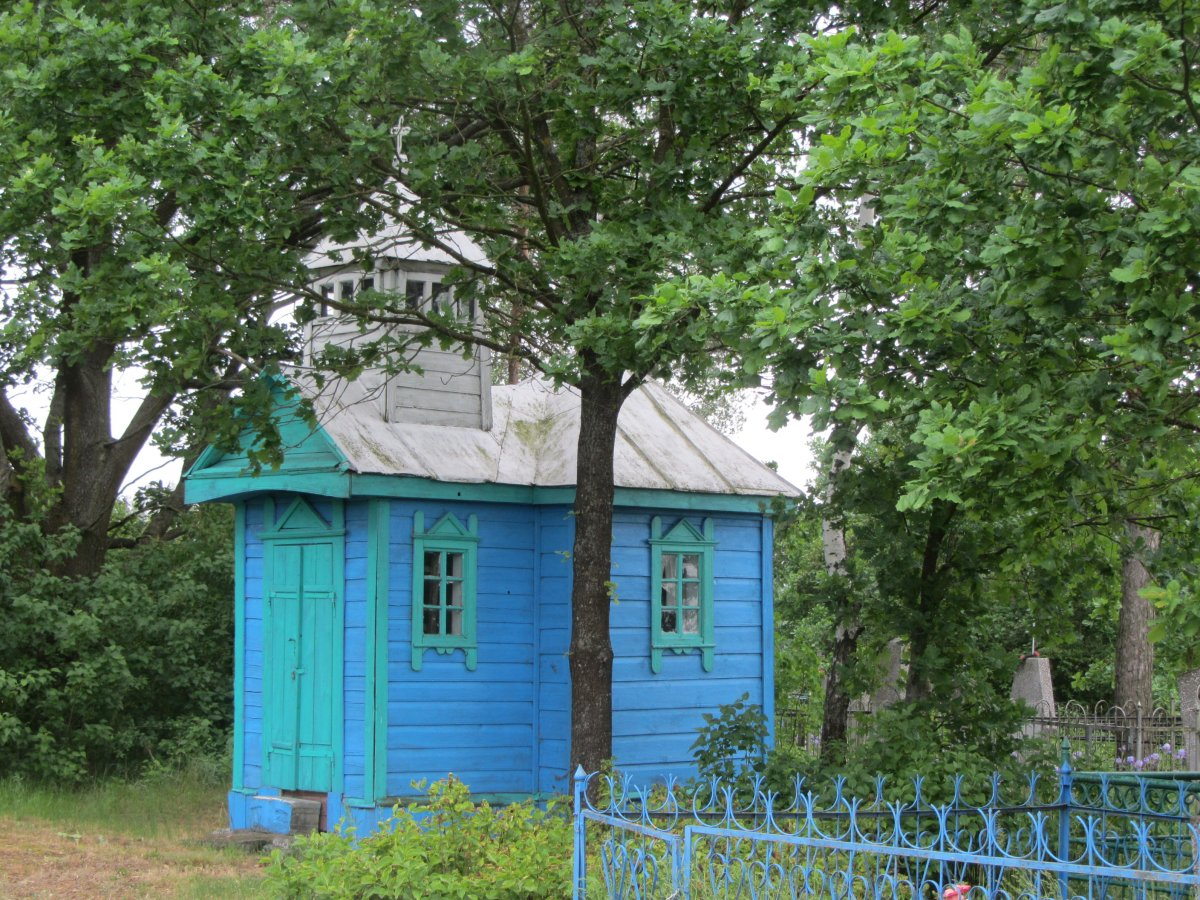
- Village chapel (19th century)

- Location in Belarus
- Coordinates: 52°05′05″N 26°29′52″E
- Country: Belarus
- Region: Brest Region
- District: Pinsk District
- Selsoviet: Kallaurowicze Selsoviet
- First mentioned: 1567

Government
  - Type: Kallauroviсhi Rural Council of Deputies
  - Chairman: V. V. Novnyko

Population (2019)
  - Total: 113
- Time zone: UTC+3 (FET)
- Postal code: 225752
- Area code: +375 165

Kallaurowicze or Kałłaurowicze (Belarusian: Калавуравічы, romanized: Kalavuravičy; Russian: Каллауровичи, romanized: Kallaurovichi) is a village in the Pinsk District of Brest Region, Belarus, located at the mouth of the Styr River near its confluence with the Pripyat River. It serves as the administrative center of the Kallaurowicze Rural Council of Deputies. As of 2019, the village had a population of 113 inhabitants.

== History ==
=== Grand Duchy of Lithuania ===
The first documentary mention of the village dates back to 1567 in the Military Census of the Grand Duchy of Lithuania. According to the document, the first recorded resident was a "mounted boyar" Ivan Maksimovich Protasovich, who arrived for duty from "Kalaur". Unconfirmed reports suggest the settlement may have existed earlier, mentioned in a 1524 privilege by Sigismund I the Old as the patrimony of the Kallaur family. The name likely derives from the surname of the founders. Linguist Mikalai Biryla suggests the surname Kalaur comes from the regional term for "guard" (karaul), while other researchers point to ancient Baltic roots such as the name Kal-a-uras. Local folklore preserves legends of an ancestor named Protas: "They said the ancestor was Protas... there was a paper – a genealogy". The village was part of the Pinsk County of the Grand Duchy of Lithuania from 1567 to 1791. Following the administrative reforms of the Great Sejm and the law of November 2, 1791, the settlement was included in the newly formed Pinsk-Zarechny County, with its center in Płotnica. The local dietine of this county took place on February 14–19, 1792, in the Church of the Assumption of the Blessed Virgin Mary in the neighboring village of Osova, where deputies to the Tribunal and local land officials were elected. The village remained part of this county until 1793, when the territory was annexed by the Russian Empire.

==== The Kallaurowicze Noble Dietine (1657) ====
In September 1657, during the War between the Polish-Lithuanian Commonwealth and the Tsardom of Russia(1654-1667), Kallaurowicze became a temporary political center. On September 10, responding to Paweł Jan Sapieha's call to fight the Cossacks, the local nobility convened a dietine presided over by the Greek Catholic Bishop Andrei Kvasninsky-Zoloty (1599-1665). The event was triggered by a split among the local gentry regarding the region's potential transition to the protectorate of the Cossack Hetmanate. The participants opposed the alliance with the Cossacks, declaring the treaty signed by Pinsk authorities under Swedish pressure null and void. This event marked the beginning of the struggle for Pinsk between the Polish–Lithuanian Commonwealth and the forces of Ivan Vyhovsky.

=== Russian Empire ===
According to the 1795 Revision Lists, Kallaurowicze held the status of a "noble hamlet" (shlyakhetskaya okolitsa), consisting of 32 households and 173 residents. It was the ancestral seat of the local gentry, most notably the Protasovitsky and Kallaur families. Other resident families included the Borichevsky, Kozlyakovsky, Lozitsky, and Vabishchevich lineages. According to data from 1808, the village was also inhabited by Jews, and there was an inn (traktir).

In the 19th century, residents belonged to the parish of St. Elijah (1788) in the nearby village of Vuyvichi. A chapel has been preserved in Kałłaurowicze (likely dating to the 19th century), which was moved to the cemetery during the Soviet period. On the 1910 one-verst map, it is marked in the center of the village. Historian Dzianis Liseichykau notes that during this period, many noble families continued to use "illegal" Greek Catholic (Uniate) chapels even after the official transition to Orthodoxy. The 1882 Geographical Dictionary of the Kingdom of Poland describes Kallaurowicze as a village partly state-owned and partly noble, "formerly Polish and Catholic". The village first appeared on known maps in the Special Map of Western Russia by Schubert (1826–1840). The settlement was also recorded on the Fitinhof Topographical Map of the Minsk Governorate in 1846. Subsequently, the cartographic data was refined on the three-verst military-topographical map of the Russian Empire in 1866.

=== Modern Era ===
From 1918, the village was part of the Belarusian People's Republic and the Ukrainian People's Republic. Following the geopolitical shifts, it was included in the SSRB and later, under the Treaty of Riga, became part of the Second Polish Republic. In September 1939, the village was incorporated into the Byelorussian SSR. Since 1991, it has been part of the Republic of Belarus. Until World War II, the local economy relied on private farms, shops owned by the Wasserman and Kallaur families, a sawmill owned by Anton Protasovitsky, and several mills. In 1949, a collective farm (kolkhoz) "Pobeda" was established, later renamed "Znamya" (1963) and "Bolshevik" (1987). In 2002, it was reorganized into the Agricultural Production Cooperative (SPK) "Kallaurowicze".

In 1978, the village was studied by the linguist Vyacheslav Verenich (1924–1990). In his records, he noted that the village made a strong impression with its high-quality residential buildings, and observed that many households had constructed greenhouse facilities under plastic covering for vegetable cultivation. The author also highlighted that the settlement is situated among the meadows and shrublands of the Nadstyr region (along the Styr River). At that time, he documented the presence of an obstetric-feldsher station (FAP), a post office, and the local village council building (Selsoviet), further noting that the local speech belongs to the Pinsk-Stakhovo dialect type.

A local secondary school operated in the village, hosting a library and a museum. One of its most significant exhibits is a bust of the Hero of the Soviet Union Zoya Kosmodemyanskaya (1966), which was transferred to the village following the closure of the school in Holtsy. The poet and public figure Ales Bibitski (1931-1998) worked at the local school for a long time. A school alley is named after him, and an exhibition in the museum is dedicated to the poet.

Notable natives of the village include Mikołaj Kałłaur (1920–2017), a Polish military officer, diplomat, and publicist; Baruch Wasserman (1882–1942), a prominent educator in local Jewish schools; his son, Misha Wrublevski, was a colleague of Janusz Korczak and Holocaust survivor who authored historical memoirs.

In 2016, the Educational Historical and Patriotic Center was opened in Kallaurowicze. Building upon the activities of the "Poisk" (Search) club, the center develops cultural, educational, and tourism initiatives. It hosts lectures, workshops, fairs, and festivals; handicraft workshops (pottery, carpentry, and weaving) are also planned. In 2018, Kallaurowicze hosted the "Festival of Small Rivers," which served as the conclusion of a cross-border environmental summer camp. Approximately 160 students from the Pinsk (Belarus) and Liubeshiv (Ukraine) districts participated in environmental monitoring posts to observe the condition of small rivers in the Pripyat basin.

Currently, Kallaurowicze serves as the administrative center of the Rural Council and Rural Executive Committee, headed by Chairman Uladzimer Naunyka. The settlement is situated within the "Srednyaya Pripyat" National Landscape Reserve, which defines its environmental significance and tourism potential. The modern economy of the village is based on the operations of the "Kallaurowicze" agricultural brigade (part of JSC "Pinskrayagroservice"), which specializes in meat and dairy farming as well as grain cultivation. Private entrepreneurship is represented by the local apiculture industry, notably the apiary of V. A. Borichevsky. Social infrastructure consists of a "Belposhta" national postal service branch and retail shop No. 45. The village has an active obstetric-feldsher station. Transportation is facilitated by regular bus services to the city of Pinsk. The street network includes Lenin and Gagarin Streets, and Znamensky Lane. The village center features a park and a historical paved road, while the Feast of the Ascension remains the community's traditional holiday (sviatok).

== Gallery ==
Kallaurowicze on maps and modern photographs

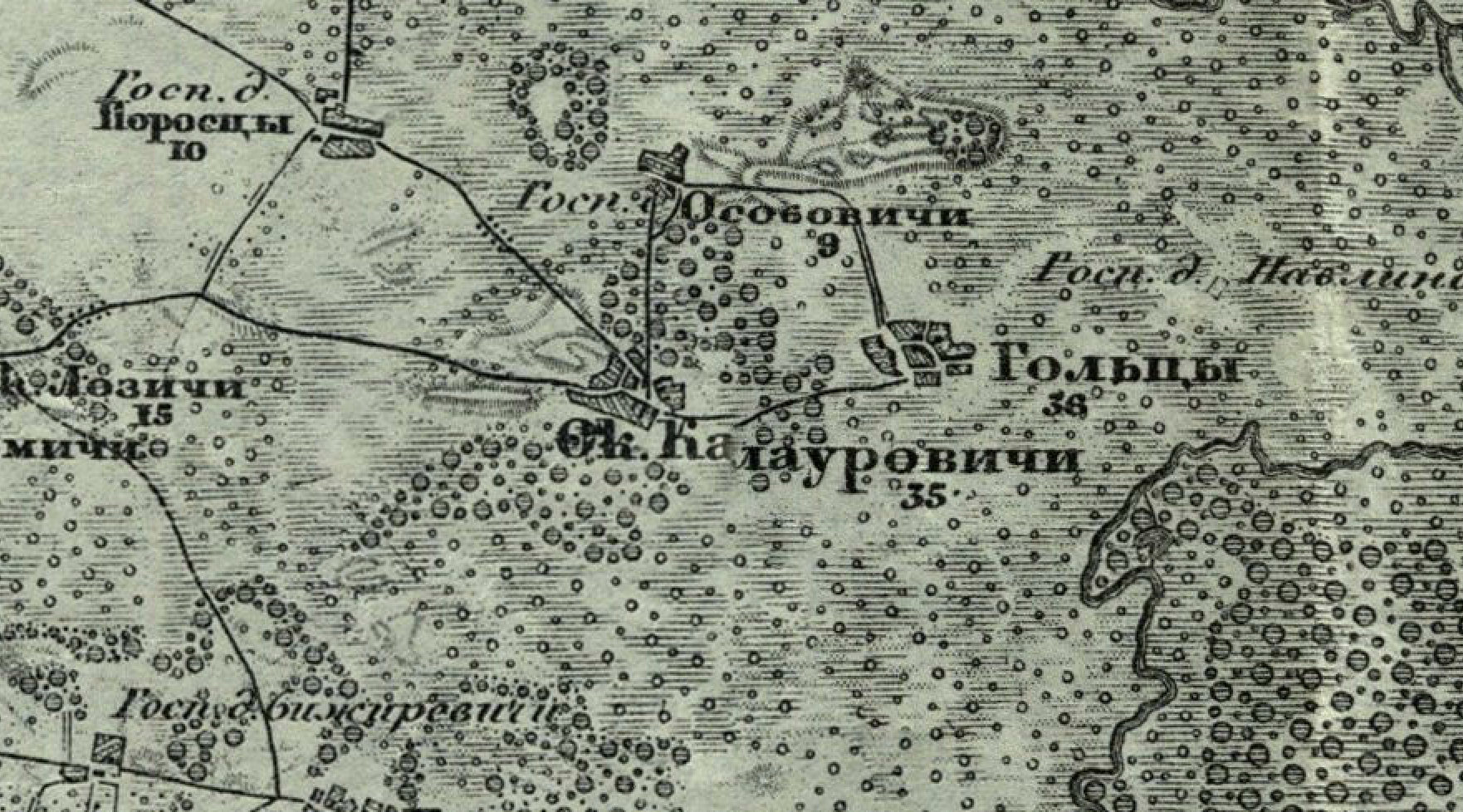
Kallaurowicze on the Schubert Map (Russian Empire), 1860s

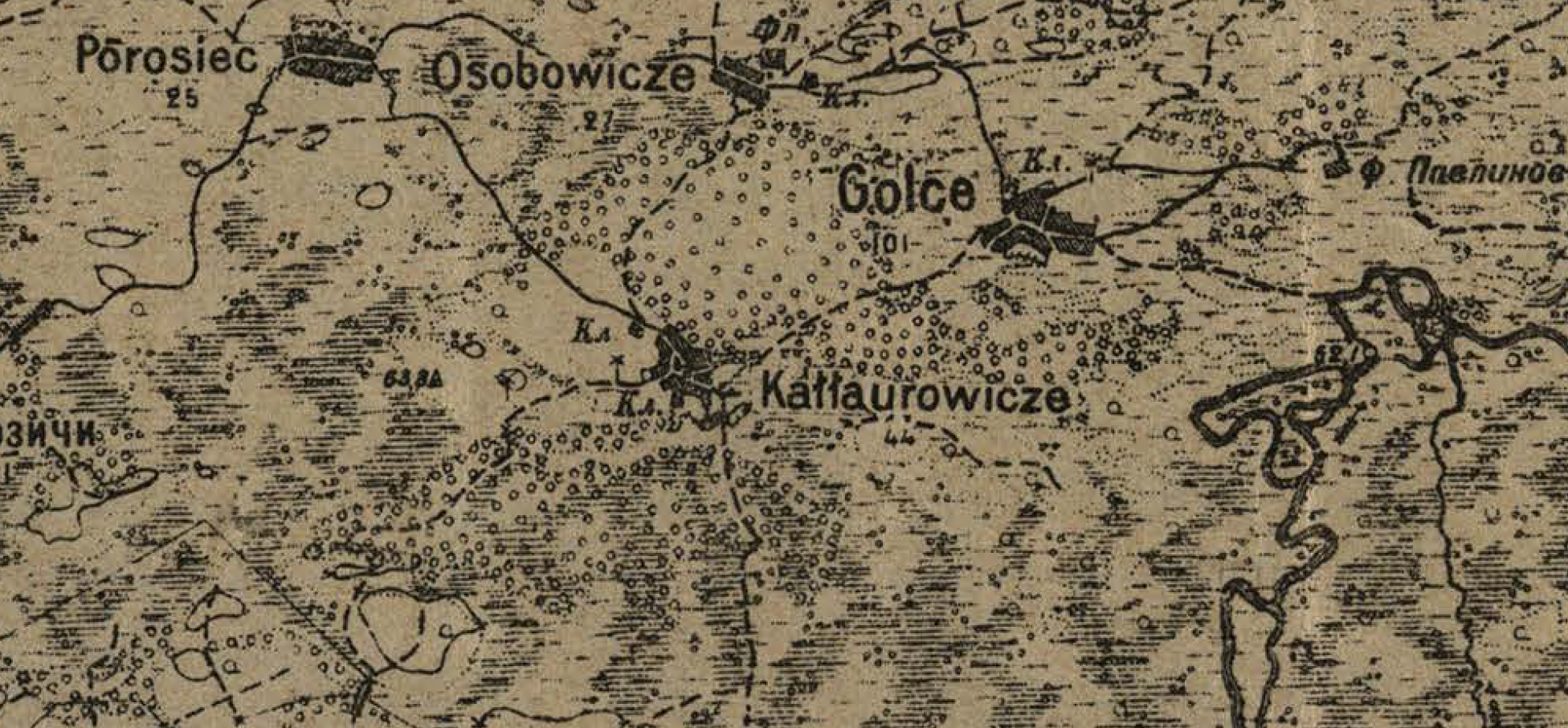
Kallaurowicze on the two-verst military map, early 20th century

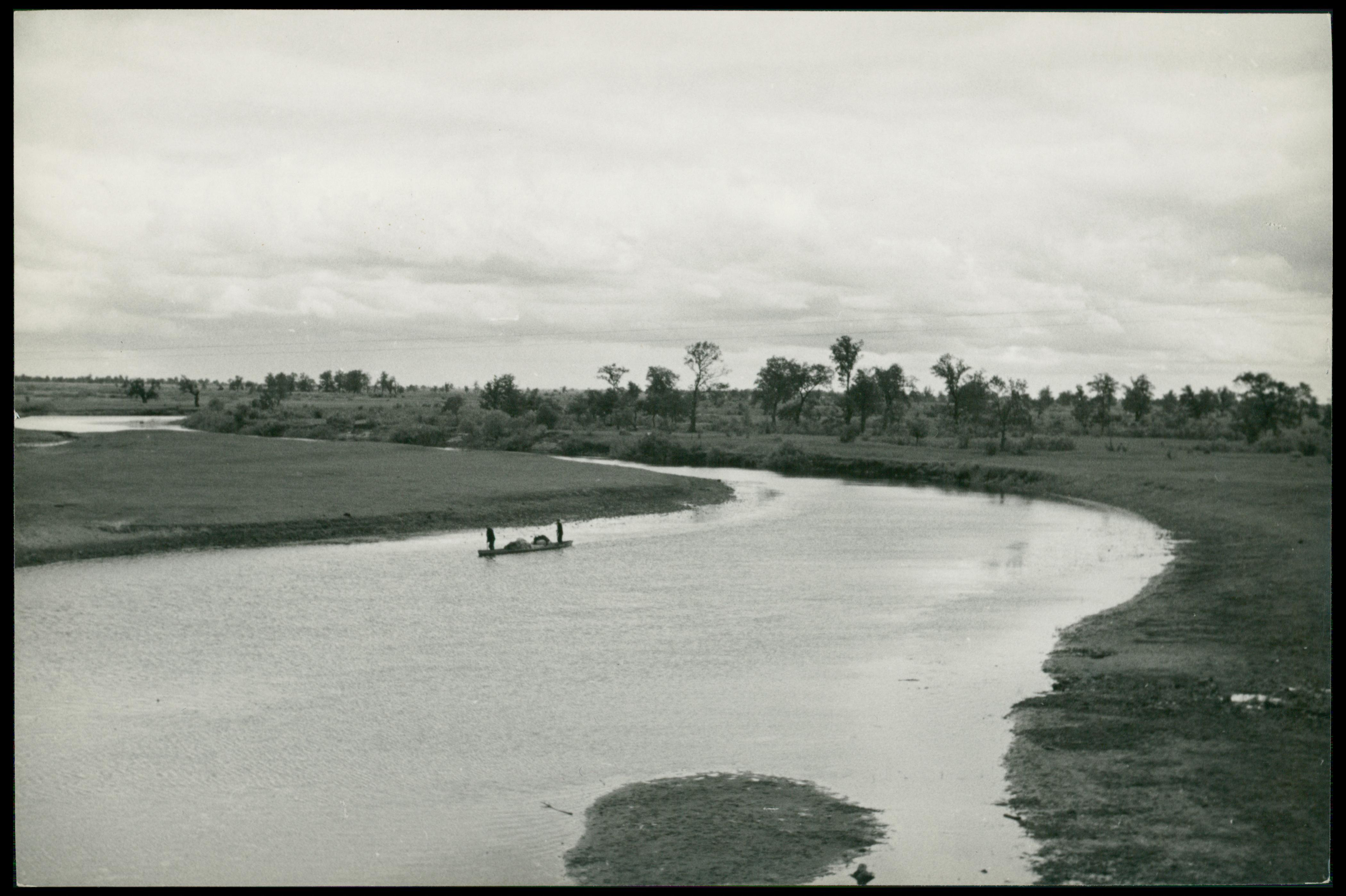
The Styr River near the villages of Kallaurovichi and Vuyvichy. Photo by Henryk Poddębski, 1930–1939.

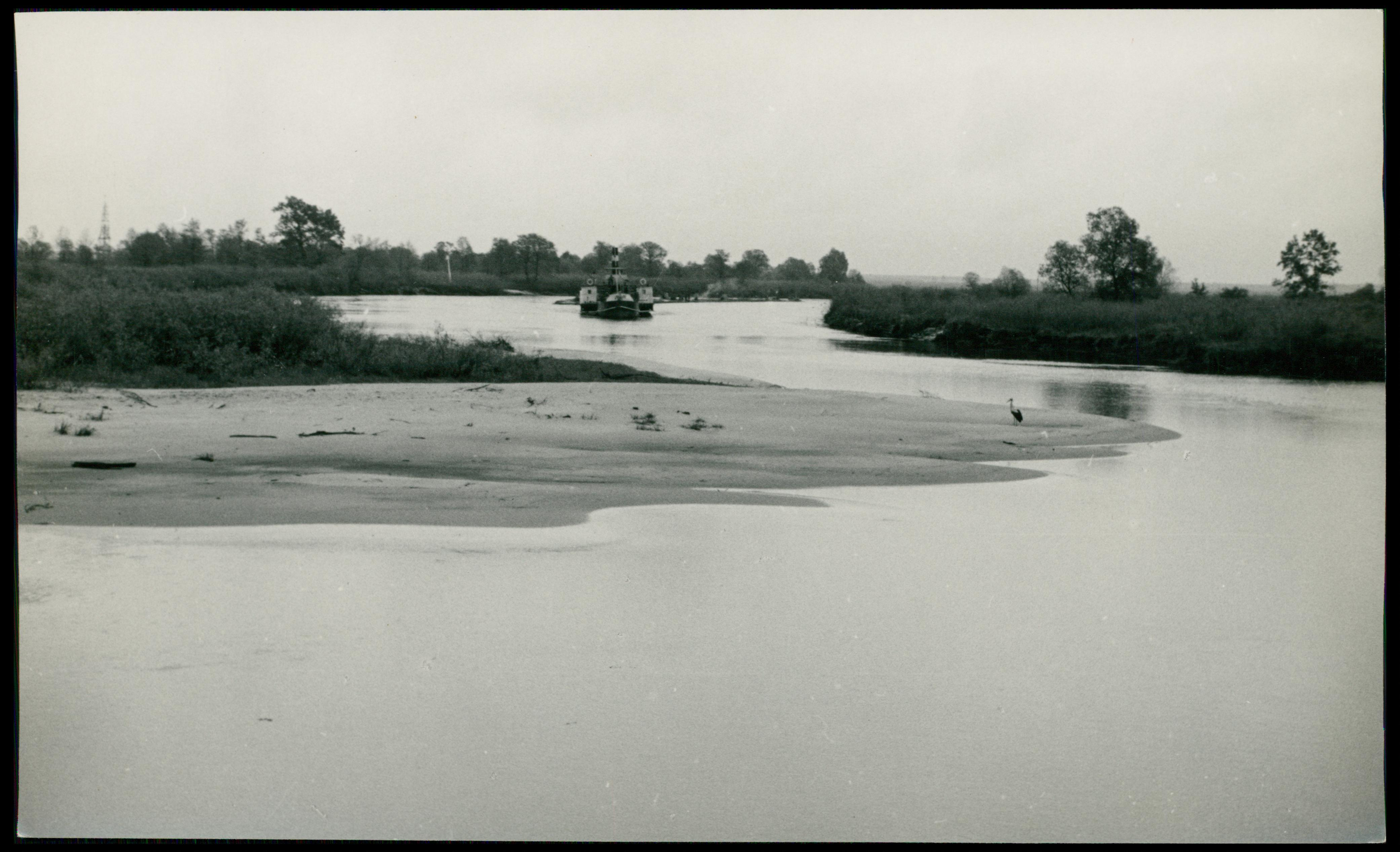
The Prypiat River near Kallaurovichi, Halcy, and Berezhcy. Photo by Henryk Poddębski, 1936.

St. Elijah Church in Vuyvichy (parish of Kallaurovichi village). Photo by Isaac Serbov, 1912.

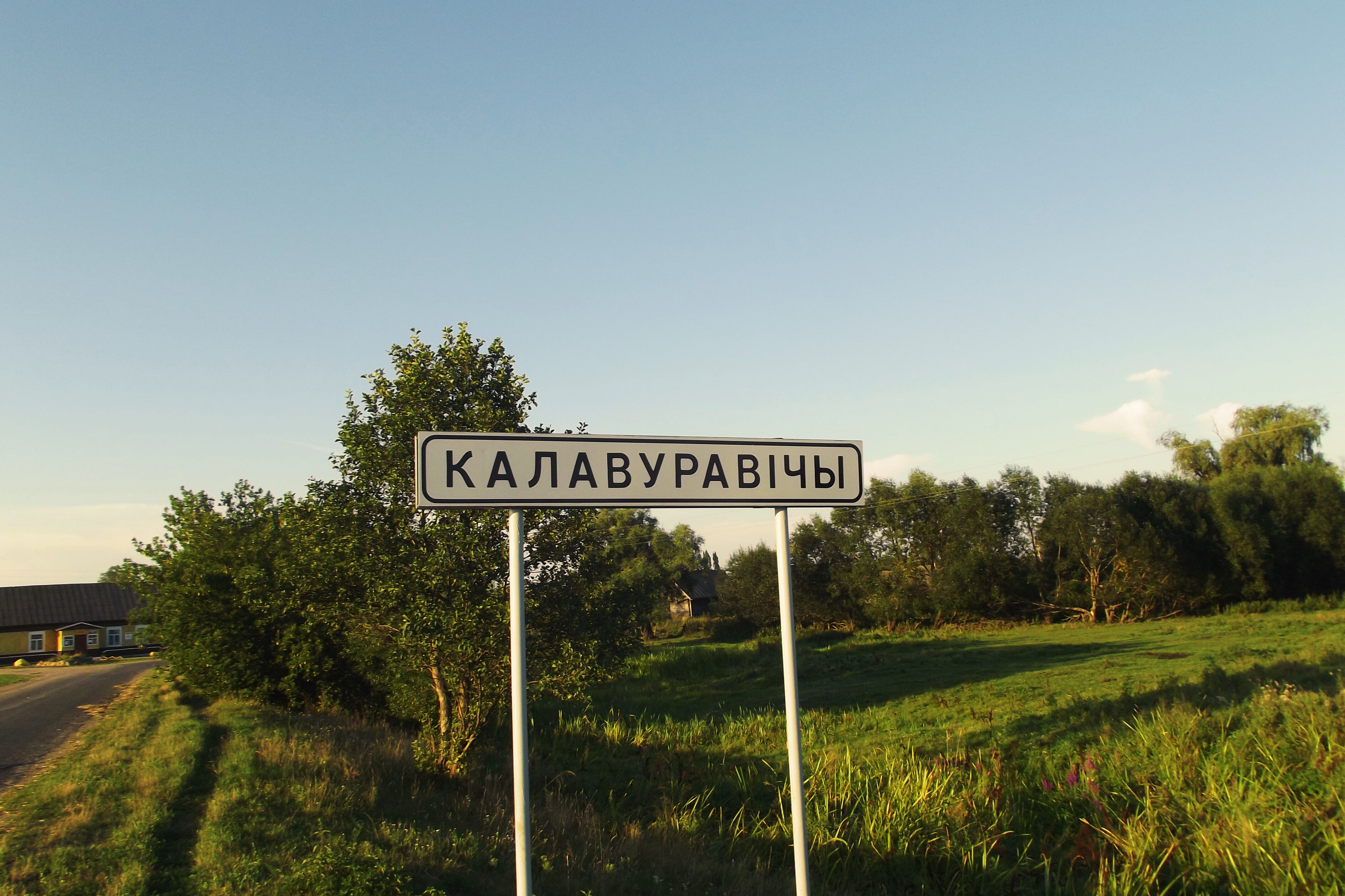
Road sign at the entrance to the village

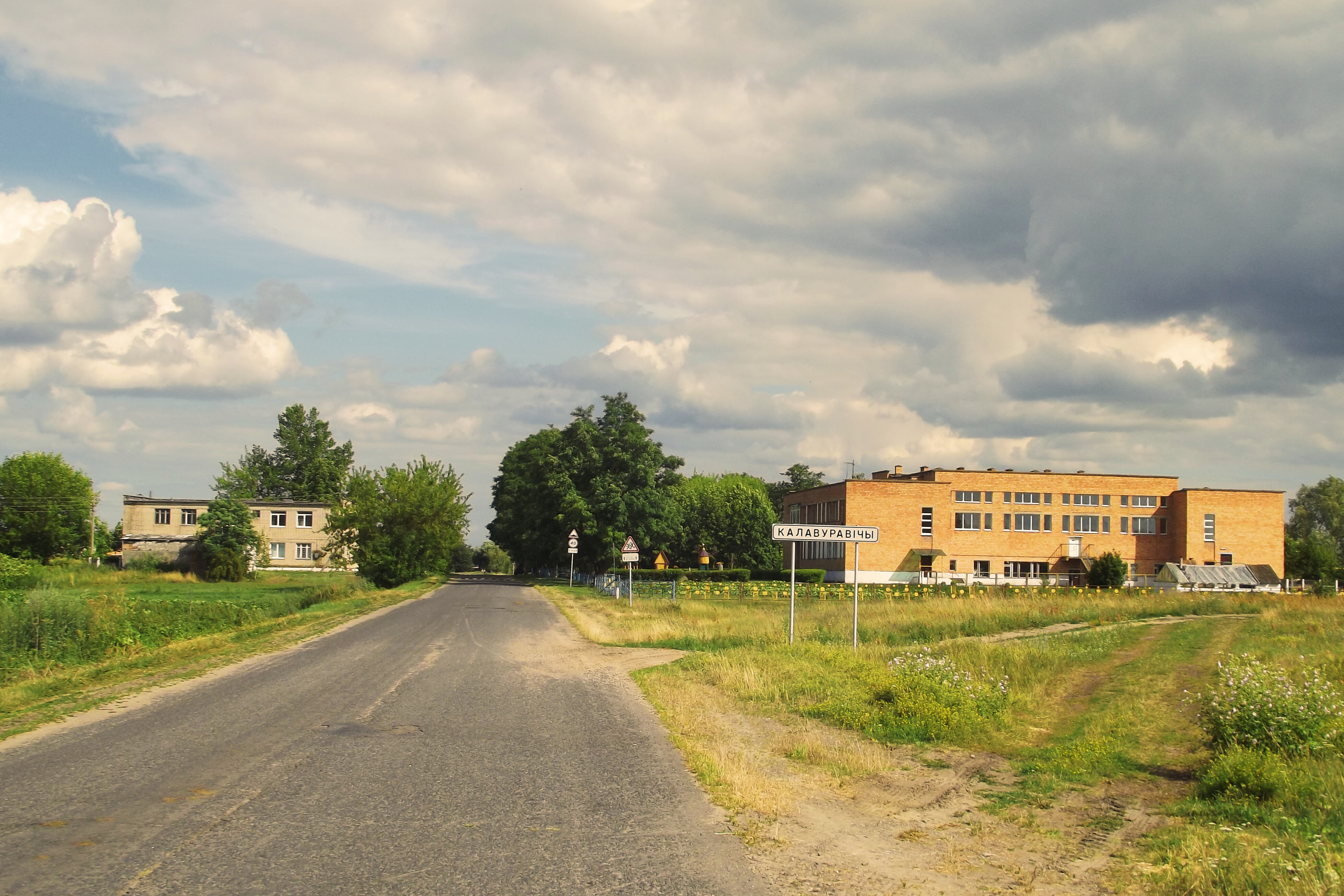
Village entrance via Gagarin Street

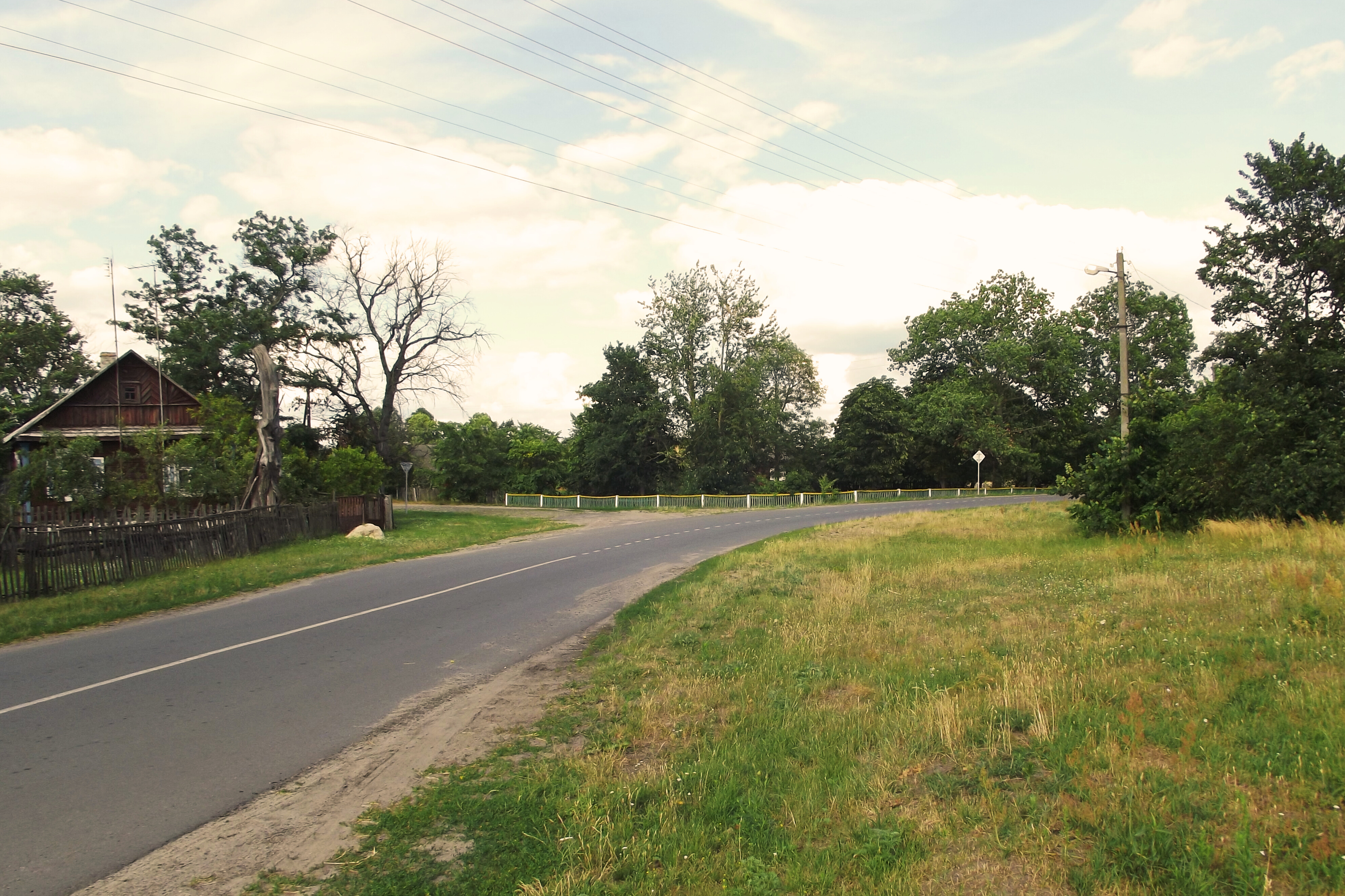
Lenin Street – the historical center

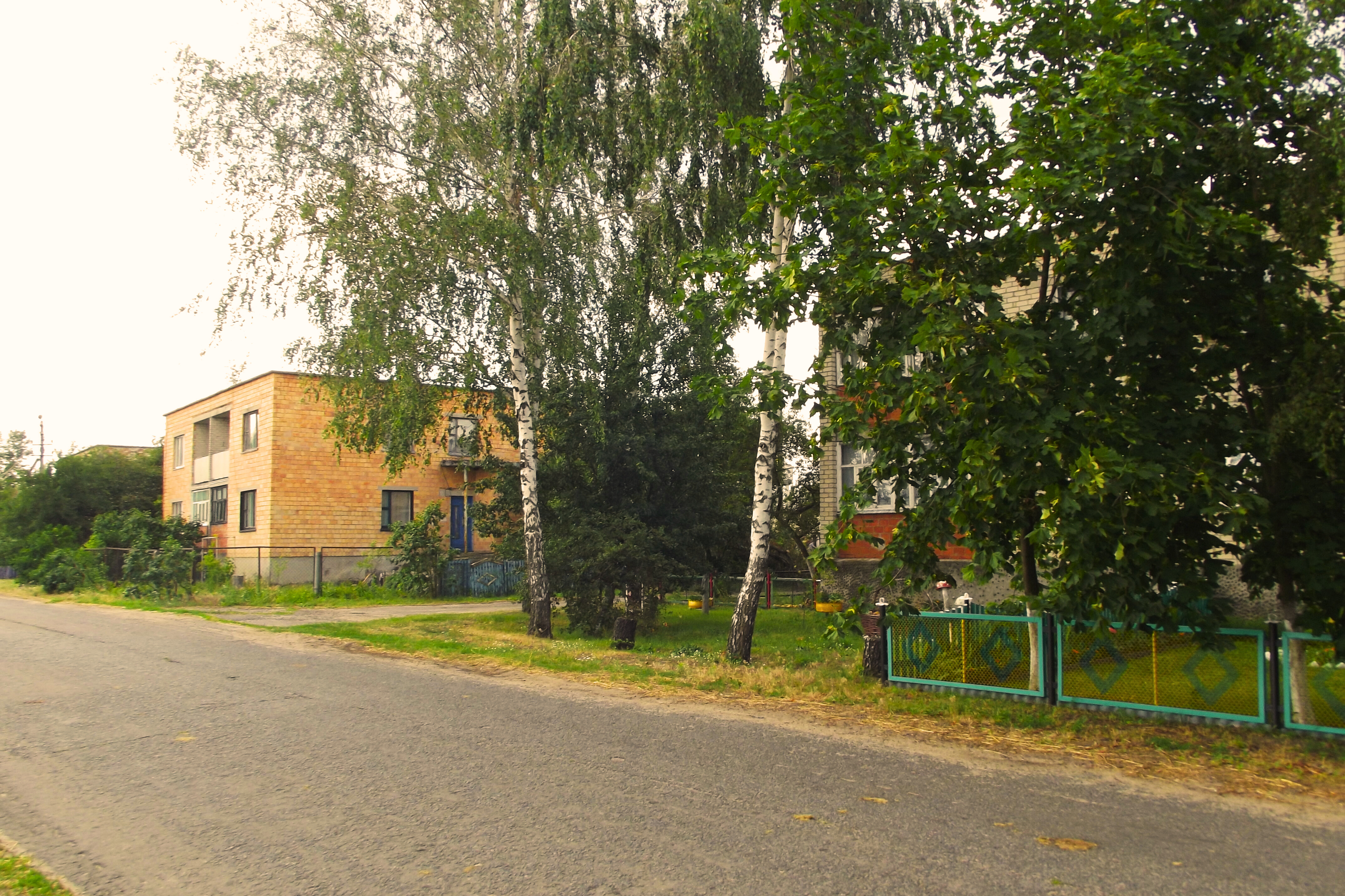
Residential houses on Gagarin Street

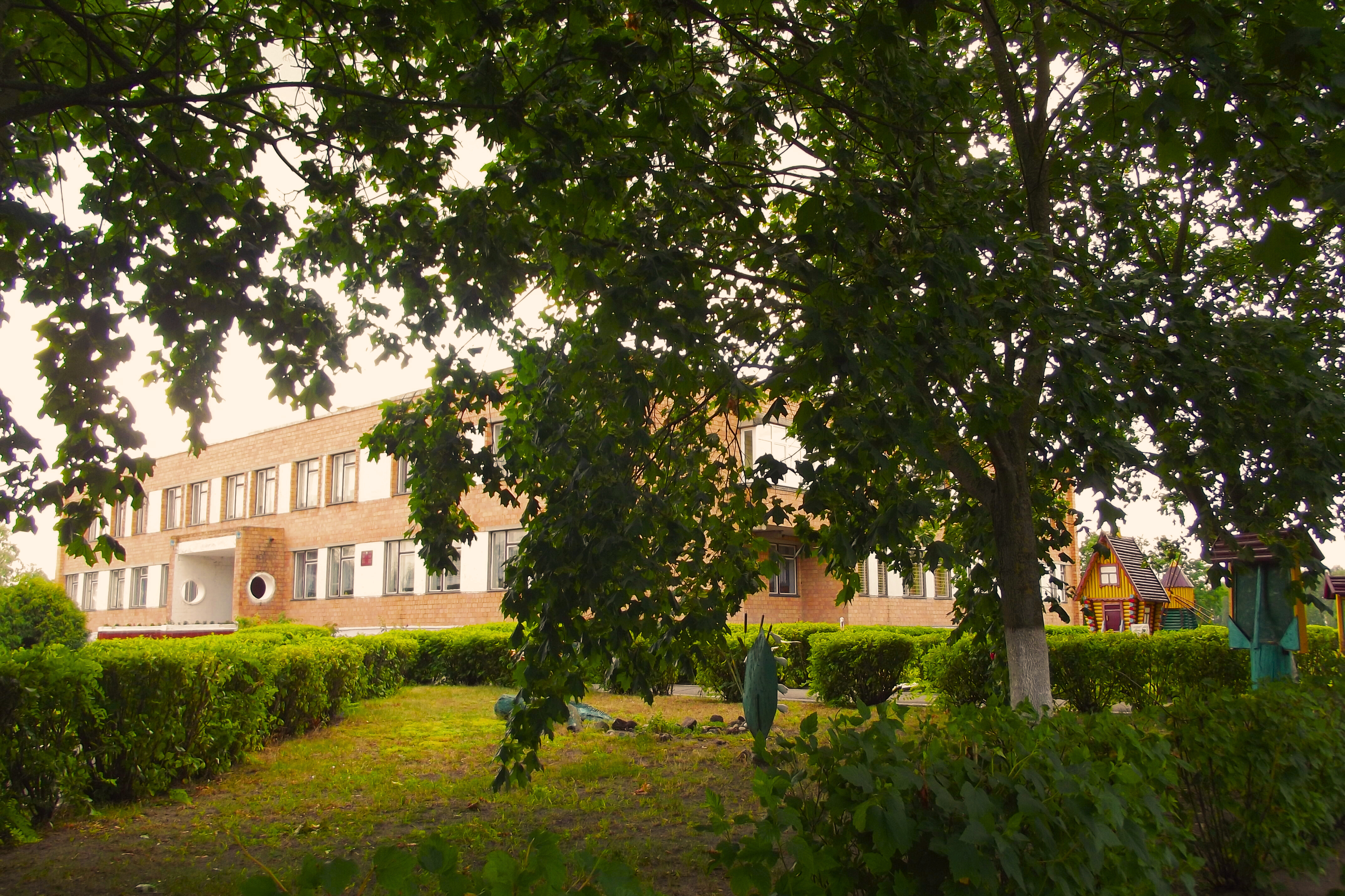
The former school and museum building
