= Jan z Jani =

Medieval voivode of Pomerelia

- Starost of Gniew; Voivode of Pomerania
- Coat of arms
- Born: 1400; Prussia, State of the Teutonic Order
- Died: 1461 (aged 60–61)
- Noble family: Clan of Ostoja

Jan z Jani (Joannes de Janie in Medieval Latin, Jan von der Jane in German) (1400–1461) - of the Clan of Ostoja was the first Polish voivode of Pomerelia (from 1454 to 1461) and one of the leaders of the Prussian Confederation, serving as a commander in the Thirteen Years' War. He was also the Lord of Regality of Tczew, Nowe and Kiszewskie, Lord of Starogard, Rabelnaw, Robaw, Pancze, Wonental, Szwarczenwalt, Weisenwalt, Moealwalt, Landesende, Turze, and Lord of Gniew.

Jan z Jani's origin was from a noble family that entered the Clan Ostoja through marriage with the sister of Mikołaj Szarlejski, who was part of the Clan of Ostoja and Duke of Inowrocław and Kujawy, Lord of Bydgoszcz, and member of the Prussian Confederation. Together with Szarlejski, Jan z Jani raised army units in Pomerania during the Thirteen Years' War and the conflict with the Teutonic Knights. He also cooperated with another member of the Clan of Ostoja, Stibor of Poniec, Lord of Regality of Greater Poland and the renowned diplomat in order to raise funds to attack Malbork, the headquarters of the Teutonic Knights.

A local legend speaks of the mighty knight Jan z Jani who designed a new coat of arms and called it the Ostoja.

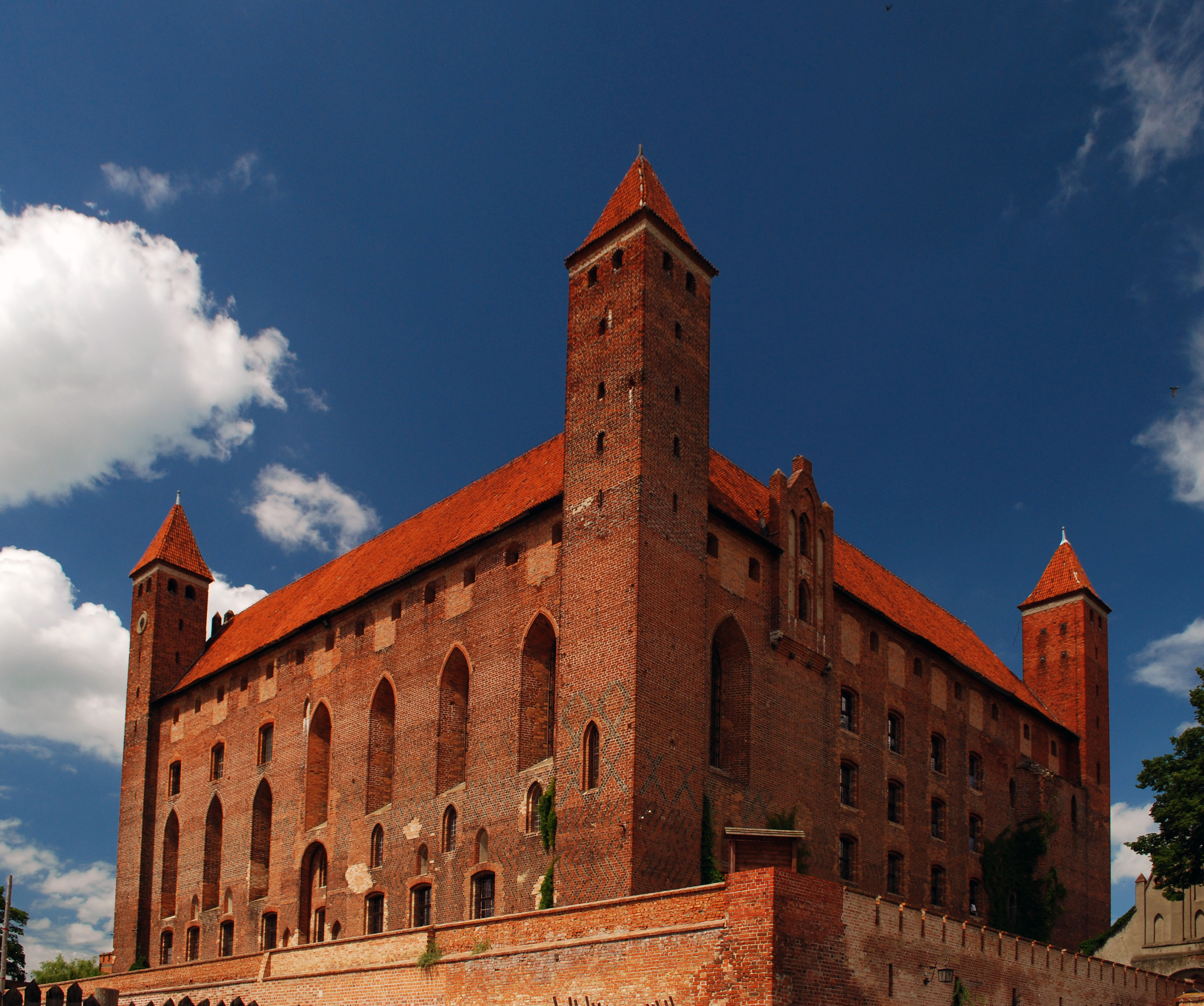
Gniew castle of de Jani

== See also ==
- Clan of Ostoja
- Ostoja coat of arms
- Stibor of Stiboricz
