= Miklaszewski =

Miklaszewski (feminine: Miklaszewska; plural: Miklaszewscy) is a Polish surname. Notable people with this surname include:

- Jim Miklaszewski (born 1949), American journalist
- Sławomir Miklaszewski (1874–1949), Polish soil scientist
