= Tadeusz Chrostowski =

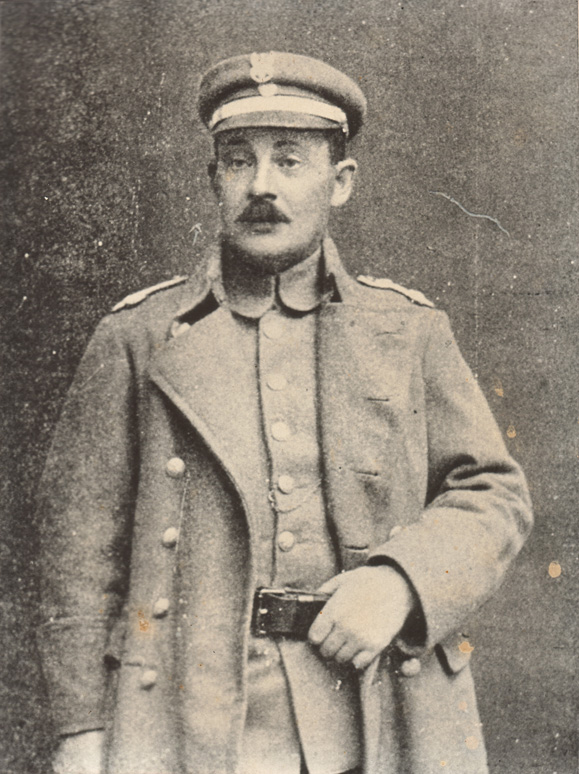

Tadeusz Chrostowski (25 October 1878 – 4 April 1923) was a Polish naturalist and explorer who made three expeditions to collect natural history specimens, especially birds, in the Paraná region.

== Biography ==
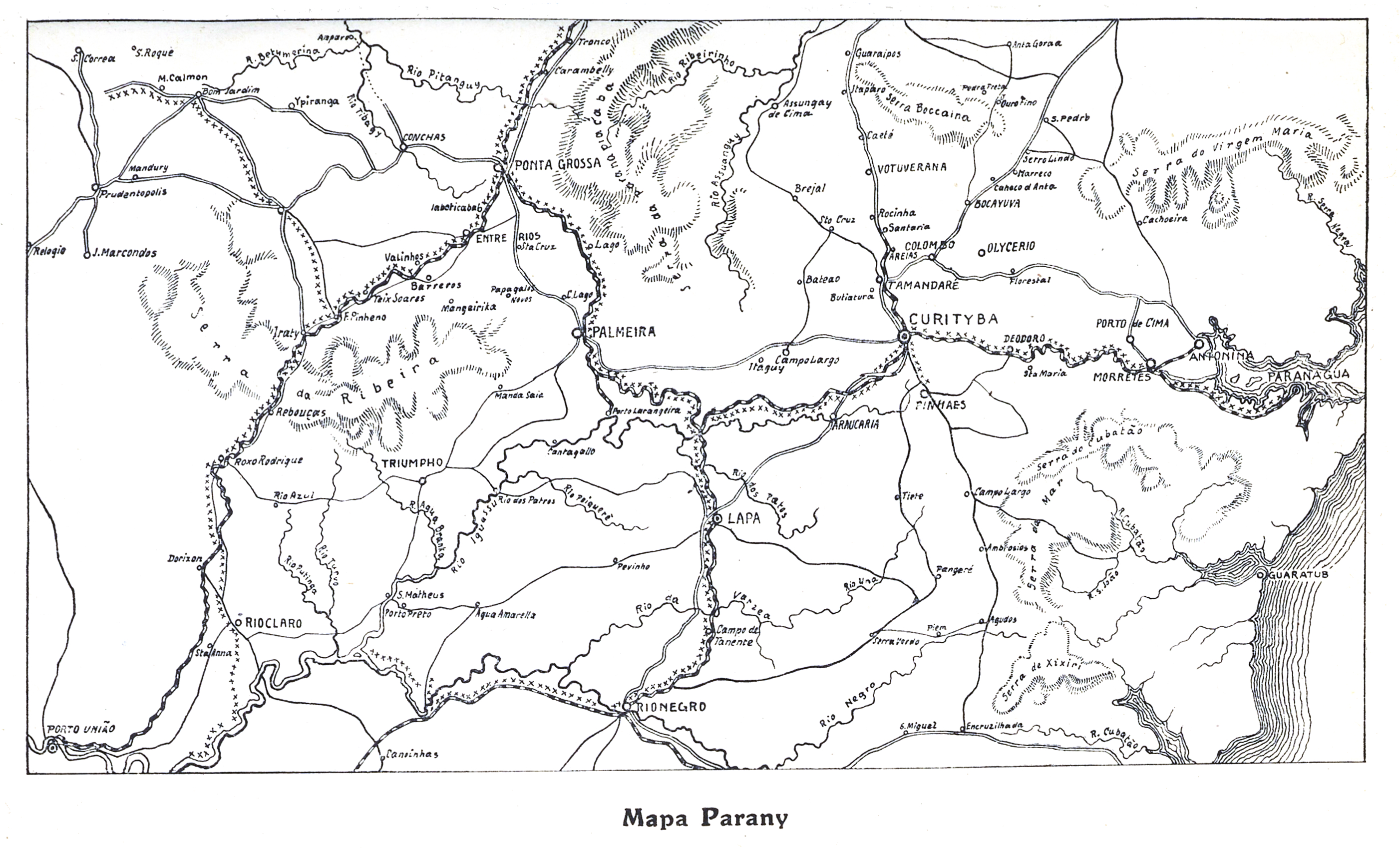
Region explored by Chrostowski in 1914

Chrostowski was born in Kamionka where he became interested in nature at an early age. He went to study physics and mathematics at Moscow University but was conscripted in the second year and sent with an infantry regiment to Siberia and Manchuria. Returning to Poland in 1907 he began to study on his own and inspired by Konstanty Jelski, he sought to explore South America. He arrived in Vera Guarana in 1910 and attempted to set up a farm. He also made a large collection of natural history specimens. In 1911 he returned to Warsaw and contributed specimens to the museum of Count Władysław Michał Pius Branicki. He then sought to make another expedition to the Parana but failing to get support from Count Branicki, he contacted the German ornithologist Carl Eduard Hellmayr who was willing to support the expedition. Reaching South America in 1913, he travelled from Curitiba to Antonio Olyntho, working briefly as a teacher. With the outbreak of World War I, he lost support from Hellmayr and returned to Europe in 1915. He was inducted immediately into the war on arrival, and served as a lieutenant with the Tsarist forces on the Swedish-Russian border. Following the Russian revolution in 1917 he defected from the Imperial army and lived under a false identity in St. Petersburg where he examined, thanks to Valentin Bianchi, the Brazilian bird collections at the zoological museum. In 1918 he returned to Poland and obtained a position at the State Natural History Museum, heading the bird department. He organized another collecting expedition to the that left on December 4, 1921 but on the way back he contracted malaria and died from other complications. He was buried at the mouth of the Iguazu River not far from the farm that he had tried starting on his first trip.
