= Ostaszewski =

Ostaszewski is a Polish masculine surname, its feminine counterpart is Ostaszewska. It may refer to:

- Angie Ostaszewski, American TikToker
- Ostoja-Ostaszewski, Polish noble family
- Henryk Ostaszewski (1892–1957), Polish lawyer and politician
- Maja Ostaszewska (born 1972), Polish actress
- Piotr Ostaszewski (born 1964), Polish historian, political scientist, translator
