= Anthony Podgorski =

Anthony Podgorski (May 5, 1903 – July 12, 1987) was an American businessman and politician.

Podgorski was born in Saint Paul, Minnesota and went to the Saint Paul public schools. He lived in Saint Paul, Minnesota with his wife and family. Podgorski was a truck driver and owned a gas station in Saint Paul. He served in the Minnesota House of Representatives from 1945 to 1966 and was a Democrat. Podgorski died from a heart attack at the Bethesda Lutheran Medical Center in Saint Paul, Minnesota.
