= Zygmunt Mokrzecki =

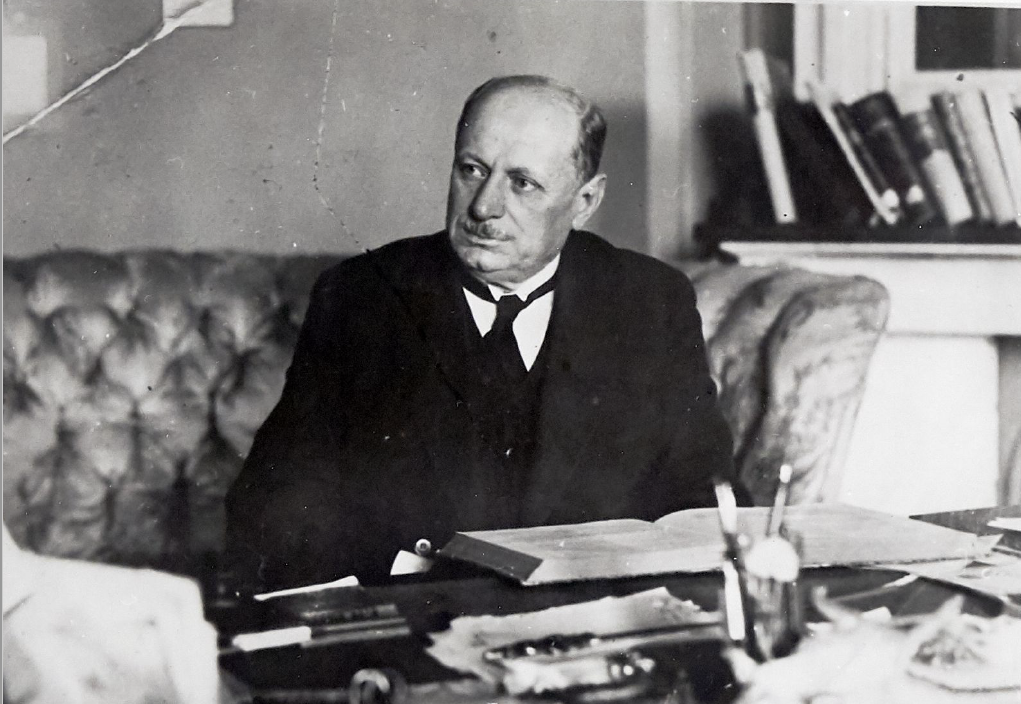

Zygmunt Atanazy Mokrzecki (2 May 1865 – 3 March 1936) was a Polish entomologist and professor of agricultural entomology who worked in Imperial Russia and Poland. Among his pioneering works was the approach to trunk injection of nutrients and pesticides into horticultural trees.

== Life and work ==
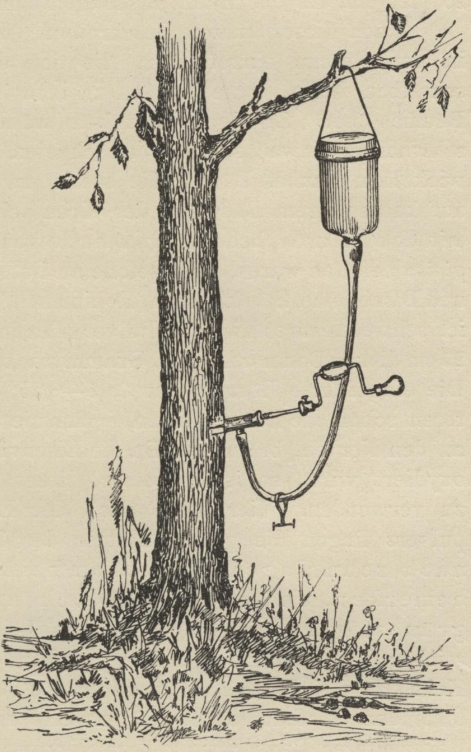
Trunk feeding of plant protection chemicals, 1903

Mokrzecki was born at Dzitryki near Lida, seventh son and last child of land owners Alexander and Kamila née Maszewka. His mother died when he was very young and he was raised by his maternal grandmother Hersylia at the estate of Winkowce where he grew up close to the fields and forests. He suffered from angina in early age. He studied at Lida before going to secondary school in Vilna and joined the forestry institute in St. Petersburg in 1884. Here he studied under Nicolas Cholodkowski, becoming interested in entomology. In 1888 his diploma thesis was on the management of the steppe forests of Veliko-Anadolsky. He was also influenced by the botanist Ivan Borodin and forestry specialist Alexander Rudzki. He worked as a forester in Kharkiv and corresponded with Marian Łomnicki at the Dzieduszycki Museum in Lviv on insects. In 1894 he became a member of the Copernicus Polish Society of Naturalists in Lviv and later at the Polish Geographical Society in Warsaw. In 1900 he spent his vacation in Warsaw examining the zoological and ornithological collections of Count Branicki. He visited Vilnius in 1910 to study insects in the gardens of the region. While at Kharkiv he worked on entomology under Ludwig Reinhart and Alexander Brandt, and in 1890-92 he also worked with W. Jaroszewski. He examined insect ecology, particularly the life of insect parasites. In 1892 he became a forest assessor in Ekaterinoslav Governorate and moved to Simferopol, Crimea. A major pest invasion led to his being posted as the first provincial entomologist under the Taurida Governorate. In 1893 he made a trip to Feodosia to study Eurygaster maurus on wheat. He established an entomological research station in Simferopol which became a model for many other organizations involved in plant protection. He introduced ideas from the US and invited Leland Ossian Howard to visit Crimea in 1907 (and later to Poland in 1927). He made use of sprays of lead arsenate, carbolineum, paris green, Bordeau mixture and sulfur-lime mixes for dealing with various pests. He also established various spraying and mechanical techniques in cultivation. He introduced a method of injecting nutrients and chemicals into the trunks of orchard trees. He also worked on biological pest control and collaborated with L. O. Howard and W. F. Fiske for the exchange of parasites particularly of the gypsy moth. He developed techniques to grow Trichogramma parasites of the codling moth. In 1896 he published a textbook of plant protection and in 1900 an entomological calendar for horticulturists. In 1910 he established the Crimean Society of Naturalists and Nature lovers which published its bulletin. Mokrzecki received a D. A. Naumov prize of the Committee of the Museum of Applied Sciences in Moscow for his work on beet webworm and apple ermine moth. In 1908 he received a gold medal from the ministry of agriculture at the All-Russian Jubilee Exhibition of Plant Acclimatization in Moscow. He began to help in the establishment of Taurida University in 1916–17 at Simferopol, particularly dealing with the agricultural faculty. He was appointed professor of entomology and in 1918 he received an honorary doctorate. Following the Russian Revolution, he left Crimea on October 29, 1920, sailing from Sevastopol where his son was a sailor aboard a steamship. He went to Constantinople and then to Yugoslavia where he took a position of government entomologist and inspector of plant protection in Sofia. He left in early 1922 and received a position at the College of Agriculture in Warsaw. The plant pathologist Ludwik Garbowski helped him obtain a position in Poland under the Ministry of Agriculture. He also received a professor of entomology position at the Lviv Polytechnic. In 1923 presided over the Polish Entomological Society. He retired in 1935 and died in 1936. He is buried at the Warsaw cemetery of Powązkowski.
