= Bratkowski =

Bratkowski (Polish pronunciation: [bratˈkɔfski]; feminine: Bratkowska; plural: Bratkowscy) is a Polish-language surname. Also: Bratkowsky, Bratkovski, Bratkovsky. Notable people with the surname include:

- Arkadiusz Bratkowski (born 1959), Polish politician
- Bob Bratkowski (born 1955), American football coach and player, son of Zeke
- Jan Bratkowski (born 1975), German racing cyclist
- Katarzyna Bratkowska (born 1972), Polish literary critic and activist
- Stefan Bratkowski (1934–2021), Polish writer and activist
- Zeke Bratkowski (1931–2019), American football player, father of Bob
