= Jackowski =

Jackowski (Polish pronunciation: [jatsˈkɔfski]; feminine: Jackowska, plural: Jackowscy) is a Polish surname. It may refer to:

- Aleksander Jackowski (1920–2017), Polish anthropologist
- Bill Jackowski (1914–1996), American baseball umpire
- Jan Maria Jackowski (born 1958), Polish politician
- Janine Jackowski (born 1976), German film producer
- Maksymilian Jackowski (1815–1905), Polish activist
- Marek Jackowski (1946–2013), Polish musician
- Olga Jackowska (1951–2018), Polish singer
- Stanisław Jackowski (1887–1951), Polish sculptor
- Stanisław Jackowski (officer) (1881–1929), Polish Army officer
