= Strzałkowski =

Strzałkowski (feminine: Strzałkowska, plural: Strzałkowscy) is a surname of Polish origin. Notable people with this surname include:

- Adrian Strzałkowski (born 1990), Polish long jumper
- Roman Strzałkowski (1941–1977), Polish footballer
- Romek Strzałkowski (1943–1956), Polish child killed during the Poznań 1956 protests

== See also ==
- Tom Strzalkowski (born 1971), American fencer
