= Chudziński =

Chudziński is a Polish surname. Notable people with the surname include:

- Andrzej Chudziński (1948–1985), Polish swimmer
- Rob Chudzinski (born 1968), American football coach

== See also ==
- Chludzinski
