= Kalaur Castle =

Defunct castle in Moldova

Kalaur Castle (Kalaur, Kalavur, Calaur, Caraul, Karawol) was a castle of the Grand Duchy of Lithuania. It was likely founded during the reign of the Koriatovichi princes in Podolia in the second half of the 14th century. It is located in the lower reaches of the Dniester, near the modern Moldovan village of Rașcov (today under Transnistrian control). It fell into disrepair in the early 16th century.

== History ==
The castle had strategic importance for the defense of the southern borders of the Grand Duchy of Lithuania and for ensuring influence in Podolia after its annexation to the principality in 1362. In 1410, Jogaila gifted lands in Podolia to Nichka Karaulsky. Historian Janusz Kurtyka suggested that Karaulsky performed official functions in the castle. Researcher Olga Biletska suggested that Karaulsky simply came from Kalaur. In 1411, chronicler Jan Długosz (1415–1480) first mentioned Kalaur among the places visited by Jogaila. In the first half of the 15th century, Vytautas gave the castle to Andrei Sudimont. It is unknown what role Kalaur played during the Lutsk War in 1431, when Podolia became an arena of struggle between Poland and the Grand Duchy of Lithuania. In 1432, the castle still belonged to Švitrigaila. However, already in 1442, it was the property of the Polish official Teodor Buchatsky. In 1545, Kalaur was mentioned as a settlement.

== Modern condition ==
The castle has not been preserved. The territory near the "Red Rocks" near Rașcov, where Kalaur was located, was explored by archaeologists Ilya Litvinchuk and Oleg Rybchinsky. According to their data, the place is a quadrangle surrounded by a rampart from 3 to 6 metres (9.8 to 19.7 feet) high and a perimeter of up to 180 m (590 ft). Three round bastions and the gate location are visible. The moat is almost not preserved. Archaeologists have reconstructed a hypothetical view of the castle. Near the village of Stroiești, not far from Rașcov, the name "Kalaur" is preserved for the forest massif.
