= Gozdawa coat of arms =

Polish coat of arms

Gozdawa
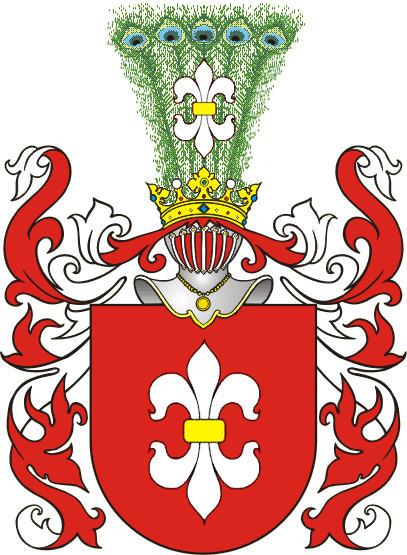
- Battle cry: Gozdawa, Gozdowo, Śmiara
- Alternative names: Gozdawita, Gozdowa, Gozdowita, Gozdowo, Gzdow, Lilium
- Cities: Baligród, Mikstat, Dydnia, Pilzno, Gozdowo, Dąbrówno, Kampinos, Nowotaniec, Włocławek, Trzebiatów
- Families: 513 names A Amszyński, Apanowicz, Arendowski, Arwasewicz, Azarewicz. B Bal, Balcewicz, Balewicz, Balsewicz, Baranowski, Bartoszewski, Batraniec, Batrań, Bączalski, Bączkowski, Bąkowski, Beecki, Behem, Behm, Beneskuł, Beneszkuł, Berecki, Berkowski, Bękowski, Białowiejski, Białowieski, Biedrzycki, Biedrzyński, Bielawski, Bielecki, Bielicki, Bierecki, Birecki, Birlecki, Biwil, Boczkowski, Boczykowski, Bogdanowicz, Bogusławski, Boguszewicz, Boguszko, Bohdanowicz, Bohuszewicz, Bohuszko, Boner, Borodnicki, Borowski, Bosiewicz, Bouszewicz, Brenner, Brolnicki, Bronicki, Brusowski, Brussowski, Bruszowski, Brzeżyka, Brzozowski, Bux, Byczerski, Bystrejski, Bystryjowski. C Cekoński, Chlebowski, Chmielewski, Chołojewski, Chołojowski, Chrapowicki, Chrostkowski, Chroszczewski, Chruszczewski, Chumecki, Chumnicki, Ciałowicz, Ciałowski, Cianowski, Cieszkowski, Cieśla, Czekański, Czekoński, Czerniewicz, Czeużyk. D Dalechowski, Danczenko, Dandelski, Dedeński, Dedkowicz, Deduchowicz, Dedyński, Dekszlewicz, Deszkleniewicz, Deszklewicz, Detkowicz, Deydyński, Dobrakowski, Dobrzymęcki, Doszkleniewicz, Dowksza, Drabow, Dradz, Drah, Drahow, Drwęski, Dryzna, Dubik, Dudziński, Duplicki, Dydyński, Dydziński, Dymsza, Dysel, Dyszel, Dyszkiewicz, Dyszlewicz, Dyszlewski, Dziarski, Dziedziewicz, Dziersznicki, Dzierśnicki, Dziewięcki. F Fabiankowski, Fabiański, Federowicz, Fedorowicz. G Gadaczewski, Garbolecki, Garbolewski, Gaździński, Gąsowski, Gdarzycki, Gdeszeński, Gdeszyński, Gentył, Gertel, Gidlewicz, Giecewicz, Gieczewicz, Gierawski, Gietowć, Gietowt, Gintwiłło, Gintyłł, Gintyłło, Giżycki, Giżyński, Glazowski, Glebowski, Gliszczyński, Głazowski, Głażewski, Głażowski, Głowiński, Głozowski, Godaczewski, Godejko, Godlewski, Godłojewski, Gołembiewski, Gołembiowski, Gołębiewski, Gołębiowski, Gombrowicz, Gorczyczewski, Gorecki, Gostkowski, Gozd, Gozdecki, Gozdowicz, Gozdowski, Grajewski, Grot, Gurzelowski. H Haiński, Hancewicz, Hanczewicz, Hański, Heymzot, Hopp, Hoppa, Hornostaj, Hornostajski, Huhlik, Humięcki, Humięski, Humiński, Humnicki, Huniatycki. I Iwaszkiewicz, Iżycki. J Jackiewicz, Jackiewski, Jackowski, Jałoszyński, Janowski, Jarząbkiewicz, Jarząbkowski, Jarzembowski, Jarzębowski, Jarzębski, Jasieński, Jasiński, Jawornicki, Jaworowski, Jene, Joneman, Juchniewicz, Juraszkiewicz, Jurgiowski, Jurjowski. K Kacki, Kaliński, Kandzierzewicz, Kario, Karpowicz, Kasperowicz, Kawecki, Kawęcki, Kawiecki, Kay, Kicki, Kilarowicz, Klemensowski, Klimuntowski, Klukowski, Kormanicki, Koryciński, Kostro, Kowalski, Koy, Kozakiewicz, Kozakowski, Krakowiński, Krobowski, Krupa, Krzywczyński, Krzywiński, Kunka, Kupść. L Lebowski, Leonowicz, Lewanowicz, Lewoniecki, Lewoniewski, Lewonowicz, Lipiński, Lisiewicz, Lubasczyński, Luboszczyński, Lucieński, Luciński, Luczyński, Łabajski, Łebowski, Łększycki, Łukoszewicz, Łukowicz. Ł Łabajski, Łebowski, Łększycki, Łukoszewicz, Łukowicz. M Małowiejski, Małowieski, Maron, Marun, Mazapet, Mianocki, Mianowski, Miaskowski, Micut, Micuta, Mielikowski, Mieżnicki, Migaczewski, Mikosz, Mikosza, Mikszewicz, Mikulicz, Milatyński, Milkont, Miłkont, Minejko, Mineyko, Mirkulewicz, Moczulski, Mucharski, Muskat, Muskata. N Nacewicz, Nachtrab, Nachtraba, Naczewicz, Nagora, Nagóra, Narbut, Narbutt, Narwojsz, Narwosz, Narwoysz, Nastalski, Nieciecki, Niedoma, Niemiro, Niemierka, Niemierza, Niemira, Niemirowicz, Niemiryc, Niemirycz, Niemirzyc, Niezdzeński, Niezdziński, Nieżdziński, Norwiłło, Norwiło. O Obrębski, Olbrycht, Olearski, Oleśnicki, Olrych, Ołdakowski, Opanowicz, Ostrołęcki, Osuchowski, Ozumieski, Ożohowski. P Pac, Pacewicz, Paczewicz, Paczewski, Paczuski, Pampowski, Pankowski, Pawłowski, Pazdziernowicz, Październia, Październowicz, Pempowski, Pepłowski, Petuszyński, Pępowski, Piasecki, Pieczychojski, Pieczychujski, Pieczychwostki, Pieczyhojski, Pierszchała, Piotrowski, Pisarski, Pławski, Płaza, Pocewicz, Podbipięta, Podgajski, Podlipski, Pogorzelski, Polikiewicz, Polikowicz, Pomarnacki, Pomarniacki, Pomarnicki, Popowski, Potuszyński, Proboszewski, Progulbicki, Proszyński, Przedborski, Przedniewski, Przemiński, Przeniewski, Prześmiński, Przęśnicki, Przybyszewski, Przyszychocki, Przyszychowski, Punikowski. R Racibor, Raciborski, Raczko, Raczkowski, Ramsz, Ramsza, Raut, Rejewski, Reklewski, Renit, Rent, Reut, Reutt, Rimsza, Roch, Romsza, Ross, Rossowicz, Roza, Rożałowski, Róż, Róża, Rubażewicz, Rubinkowski, Rubińkowski, Rudawski, Rudoszański, Rusieński, Rusiński, Rutkowski, Rychliński, Rymowicz, Rymsz, Rymsza, Rymszewicz. S Sapieha, Sasin, Secimski, Siewruk, Sobuś, Sokoł, Sokołowicz, Sokołowski, Sokół, Solecki, Sołonski, Sołouwski, Sołowski, Sosnowski, Spiegajło, Spigajło, Stan, Staniewicz, Staniński, Stankowski, Stano, Stanowski, Stawicki, Stawiski, Stępski, Strebejko, Stryżowski, Strzemeski, Strzeszkowski, Strzyżewski, Strzyżowski, Styrpejko, Suchszewski, Sudraski, Sudrawski, Sudrowski, Sulimowski, Skrzypczyk, Sułocki, Suszycki, Sutocki, Suzin, Swirtun, Szewerdzic, Szołomicki, Szymanowski, Szystowski. T Telesznicki, Teleśnicki, Teleżyński, Tomikowski, Towtowicz, Trypolski, Tryzna, Trzciński, Trzemeski, Tułuntowicz, Turczynowicz, Turczyński, Turkowiecki, Turkowski, Tyszecki, Tyszkowski, Tyszyński. U Uglik W Wachanowski, Wahanowski, Wakulewicz, Wertel, Wierowski, Więckiewicz, Więckowicz, Wilamowicz, Wilejko, Wilewski, Wileyko, Wiszewaty, Wiszniewski, Wita, Witulski, Wituski, Wnitow, Wojkunowski, Wołczyński, Wołk, Woychun, Woyzgiałło, Wyrzykowski. Z Zaboklicki, Zaczeński, Zadczeński, Zakrzewski, Zatorski, Zawada, Zawołaj, Zdzarski, Zdziarski, Zebowicz, Zembowski, Zembrowski, Zerznicki, Ziabko, Ziołowski, Złotowski, Zmilewski, Zniechowicz, Zuzin, Zwolański, Zydzki, Ździarski.

Gozdawa (Latin: Flores liliae in campo rubeo) is a Polish nobility Coat of Arms. It was used by several szlachta families in the times of the Kingdom of Poland and the Polish–Lithuanian Commonwealth.

== History ==
It is believed that the Gozdawa coat of arms was granted by Władysław I Herman to the knight Krystyn z Gozdawy (Krystyn from Gozdawa) for bravery on the battlefield in the 11th century. The lily symbolizes the immaculate knighthood and the peacock feathers in the crest represent wisdom.

== Notable bearers ==
Notable bearers of this Coat of Arms include:

- Pac family
- Jan Mikulicz-Radecki
- Stefan Lech Sokołowski

== Gallery ==
Chłusowicz

Baron Chłusowicz

Bełdowski

== See also ==
- Polish heraldry
- Heraldic family
- List of Polish nobility coats of arms

== Bibliography ==
- Tadeusz Gajl: Herbarz polski od średniowiecza do XX wieku : ponad 4500 herbów szlacheckich 37 tysięcy nazwisk 55 tysięcy rodów. L&L, 2007. ISBN 978-83-60597-10-1.
