= Pańska Dolina =

Former village in Rivne Oblast, Ukraine

- Village (no longer existing)
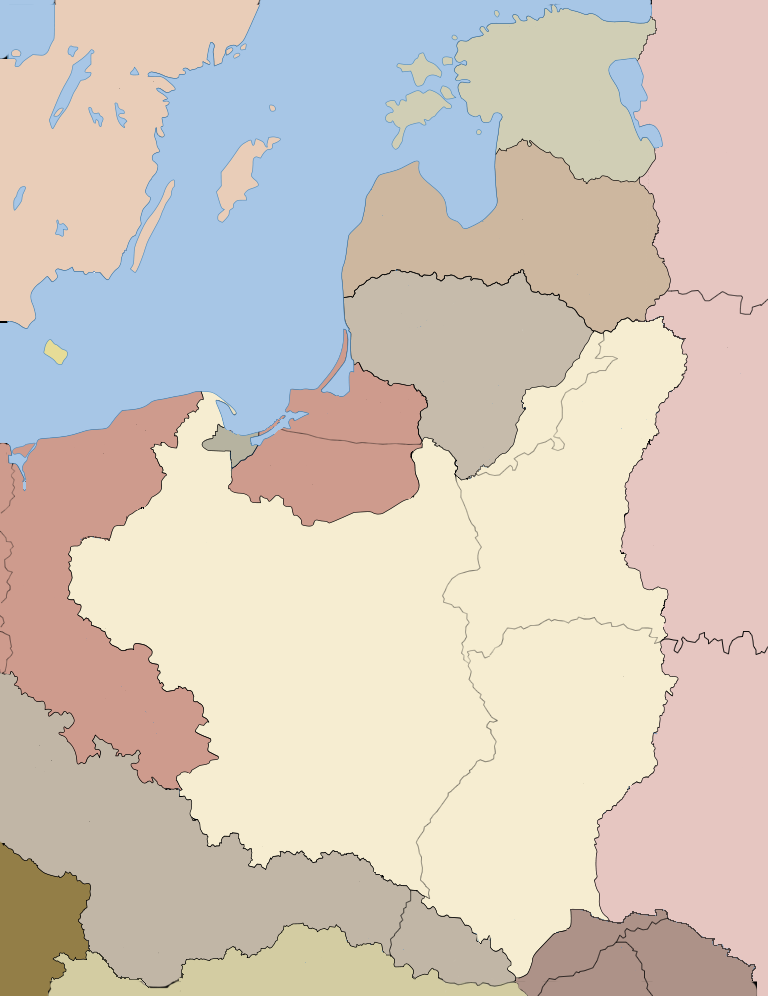
- Location of Pańska Dolina on the map of interwar Poland (1918–1939) prior to the Nazi-Soviet invasion of 1939 and the UPA ethnic cleansing
- Country: (Poland) Second Polish Republic
- Voivodeship: Wołyń Voivodeship
- County: Powiat Dubno
- Coordinates: 50°23′N 25°44′E

Pańska Dolina was a Polish village. The village was liquidated during the Polish population transfers after World War II, when the Kresy macroregion was formally incorporated into the Soviet Union (as agreed at the Potsdam Conference of 1945). Pańska Dolina used to be located in Gmina Młynów, Powiat Dubno (county), of the Wołyń Voivodeship, before the Nazi German and Soviet invasions of Poland in September 1939. Its former location can be found near Mlyniv in Dubno Raion of present-day Ukraine.

== World War II history ==
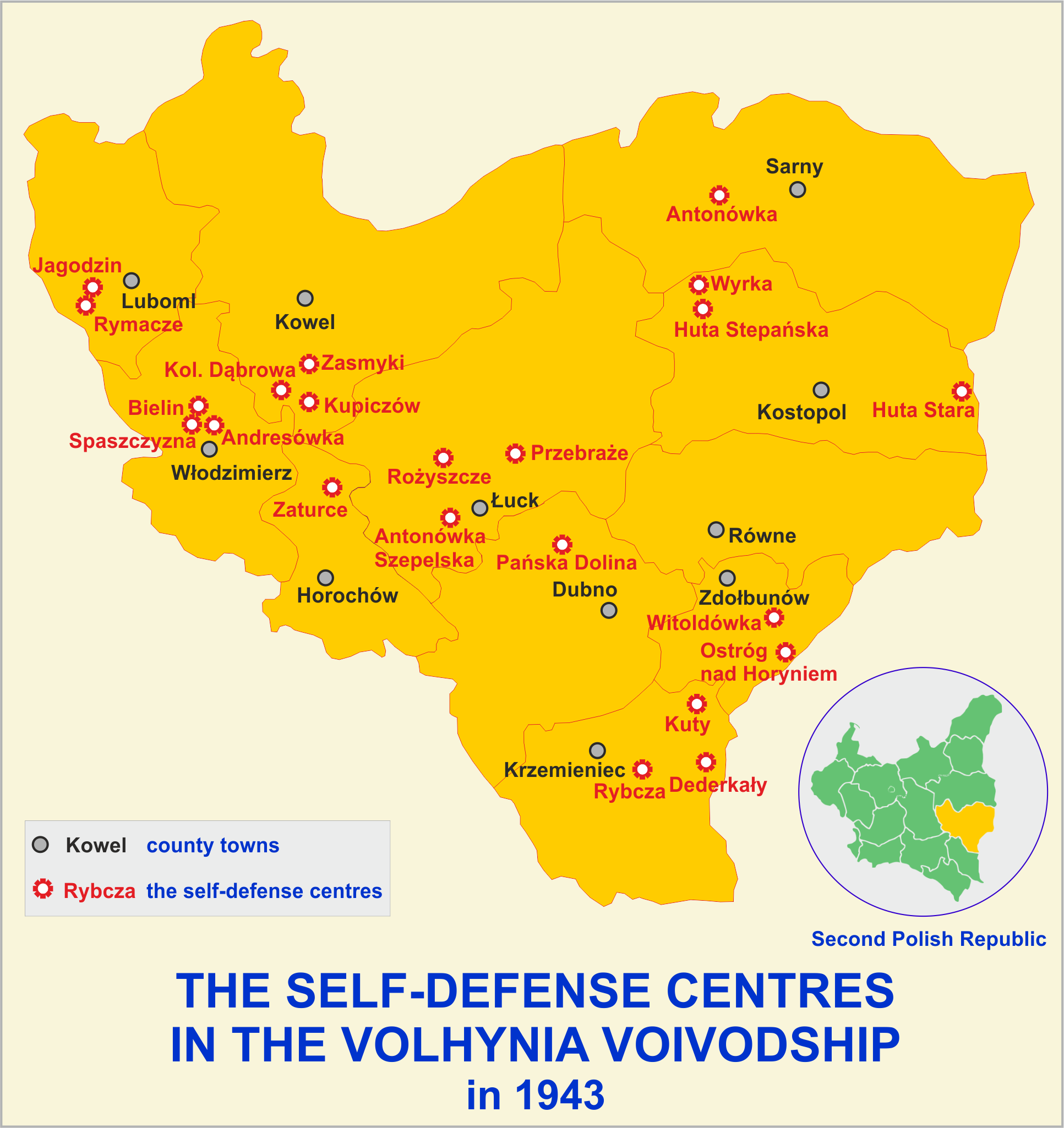
The self-defence centres in Wołyń Voivodeship, 1943

The village was one of several points of Polish defence against the OUN-UPA murderous raids during the wave of massacres of Poles in Volhynia between 1942 and 1945. The Polish self-defence unit represented mostly by Armia Krajowa managed to hold their position there till the arrival of the Red Army in 1944. The village offered protection to Polish and Jewish escapees from the area, provided food and shelter, and organised counter-attacks against the UPA attackers.

The list of Polish villages from the area that managed to defend themselves against the genocide being committed by the Ukrainian nationalists include: Pańska Dolina, Zaturce, Huta Stara, Zasmyki, Dąbrowa, Dederkały, Rybcza, Jagodzin-Rymacze, Przebraże (see Przebraże Defence), Rożyszcze, Antonówka Szepelska, Bielm-Spaszczyzna, Witoldówka, Ostróg; as well as Młynów, Kurdybań Warkowicki (no longer existing, similar to many of the aforementioned settlements), Lubomirka, Klewań, Rokitno, Budki Snowidowickie, and Osty. Many Polish villages were liquidated during the Polish population transfers.
