= House of Sinodi-Popov =

- Дом Синоди-Попова (Russian)
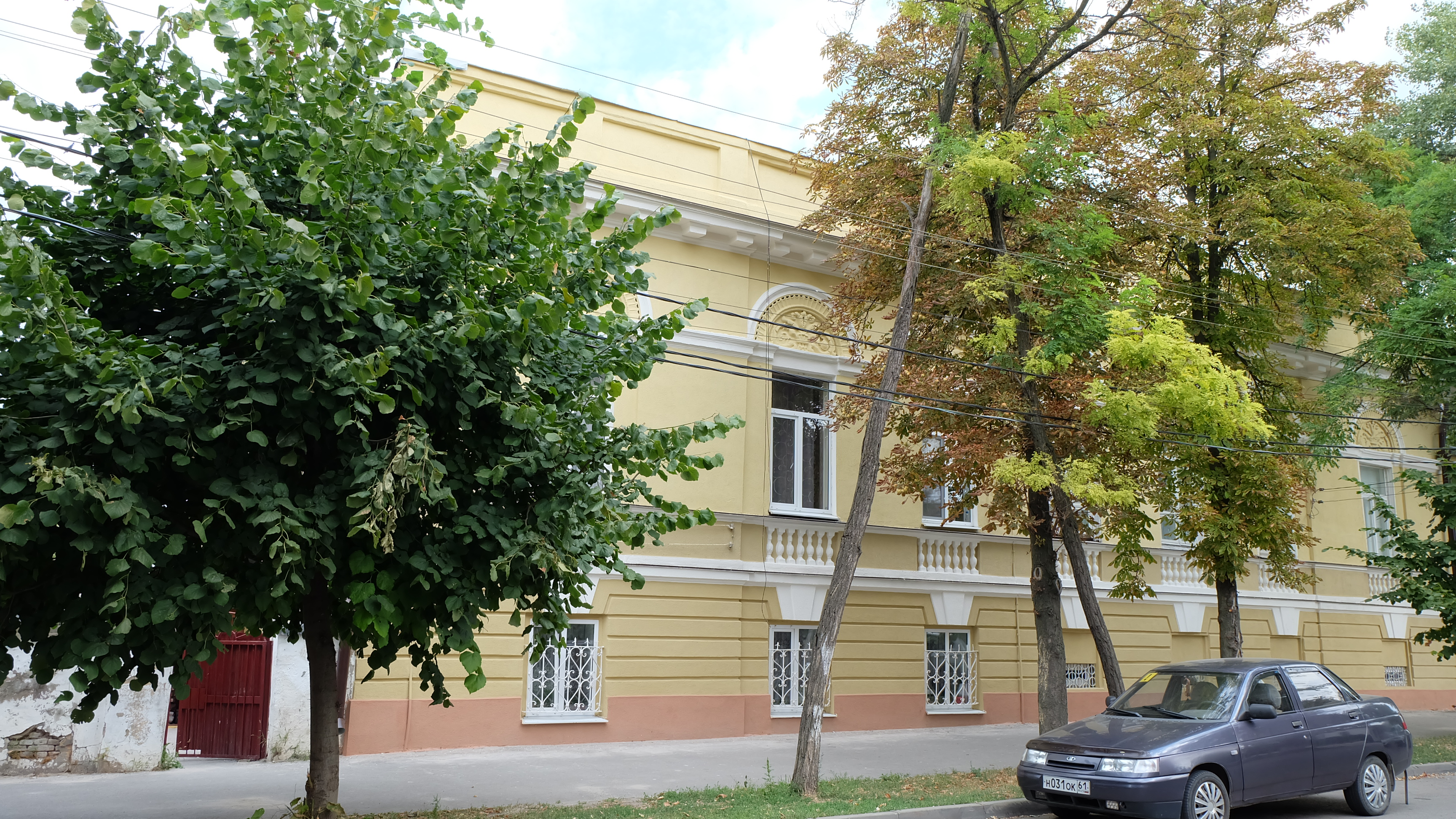
- Sinodi-Popov' house built in the 1840th years in Taganrog
- Interactive map of the House of Sinodi-Popov area

General information
- Location: 84 Grecheskaya Street, Taganrog
- Coordinates: 47°12′53″N 38°55′59″E
- Completed: 1840

The House of Sinodi-Popov (Russian: Дом Синоди-Попова) is an object of cultural heritage located at 84 Grecheskaya Street in the city of Taganrog, Rostov Oblast. Monument of architecture.

== History ==
In the middle of the 18th century, Sinodi-Popov ancestors traded near the Temernik River and on the cape Tagan-Roge. The Berdyansk merchant Georgy Semyonovich Sinodi-Popov who was born in 1755 is considered the Taganrog Sinodi-Popov ancestor.

In the 1840s down the street Greek, 84, Sinodi-Popov family built the new house. There is no reliable and exact information about the origin of a double surname of these people. In the metrics book of 1853 there is information on the son Dmitry and his father Min Egorovich Popov, but the double surname while researchers did not manage to find mentions about a separate surname of Sinodi already occurs in other documents to the first half of the 19th century at this family.

It is known that two brothers Semyon Egorovich Popov and May Egorovich Popov lived in Taganrog. Both were hereditary honorary citizens. Two versions of a middle name of brothers — "Egorovichi" and "Georgiyevichi" occur in different documents.

Maria Dionisyevna was Minaya Egorovich's spouse. They had several children: Ekaterina, Elena, Georgy, Egor, Dmitry. Semyon Egorovich's wife called the Olympic Games Vasilyevna Palam, in marriage at them two daughters were born: Anna and Anya. Semyon Popov was the representative of the Netherlands consulate in Taganrog, and since 1872 — represented also the Portuguese consulate. Did charity work, took part in the life of Society for assistance to all persons in need, on an equal basis with other famous residents of Taganrog — Lakier, Scaramanga, Varvakis, Alferaki, Litsin, Bernardaki. Semyon Popov was magistrate judge and it appeared in the first list of District court which opened on April 30, 1869. Also, he fulfilled the librarian's duties in an establishment at the Commercial meeting, he performed this work free of charge. It assisted the author Pavel Petrovich Filevsky in writing of the book "History of the City of Taganrog", telling some facts.

One of the famous descendants of a family — the artist Dmitry Minayevich Sinodi-Popov, in the first floor of this house its workshop from 1870s settled down. From 1873 to 1880 the house belonged to the hereditary honorary citizen Sinodi Popov, from 1890 to 1898 the hereditary honorary citizen Semyon Sinodi-Popov was its owner. In 1906 carried over the hereditary honorary citizen Minaya Egorovich and Andii Semenovna Sinodi-Popov and also the wife of the hereditary honorary citizen Elena Semenovna Avyerino.

In the 1910s Semyon Egorovich Popov's daughter — Elena Semenovna Avyerino, supported a school of boys and girls in the house. These years Lyubov Nikolaevna Psalti — the teacher of German in a men's gymnasium rented housing here. It worked also in the private school of the I category of A. A. Granovsky. In 1918 on a farmstead, the warehouse of sewing machines of Zinger and TO was located. The house was the property of descendants of brothers Sinodi-Popov up to the October Revolution. Then became the property of German F. E. Dreylinga who owned the house till 1925. According to other data in the house in the 1920s, the literary proletarian club was located, after the termination of its activity, this building became a house. Since 1992 it is recognized as a monument of architecture and it is protected by the law.

== Description ==
The facade of the house decorates the modeled drawing. The porch of the house is created with three columns. The house is the two-storeyed, ground first-floor. All facade occupies a squared pediment which settles down over the crowning eaves with croutons. Windows of the first floor decorate capstones. Over windows of the second floor the vegetable ornament is created, and under windows — false rail-posts are made.

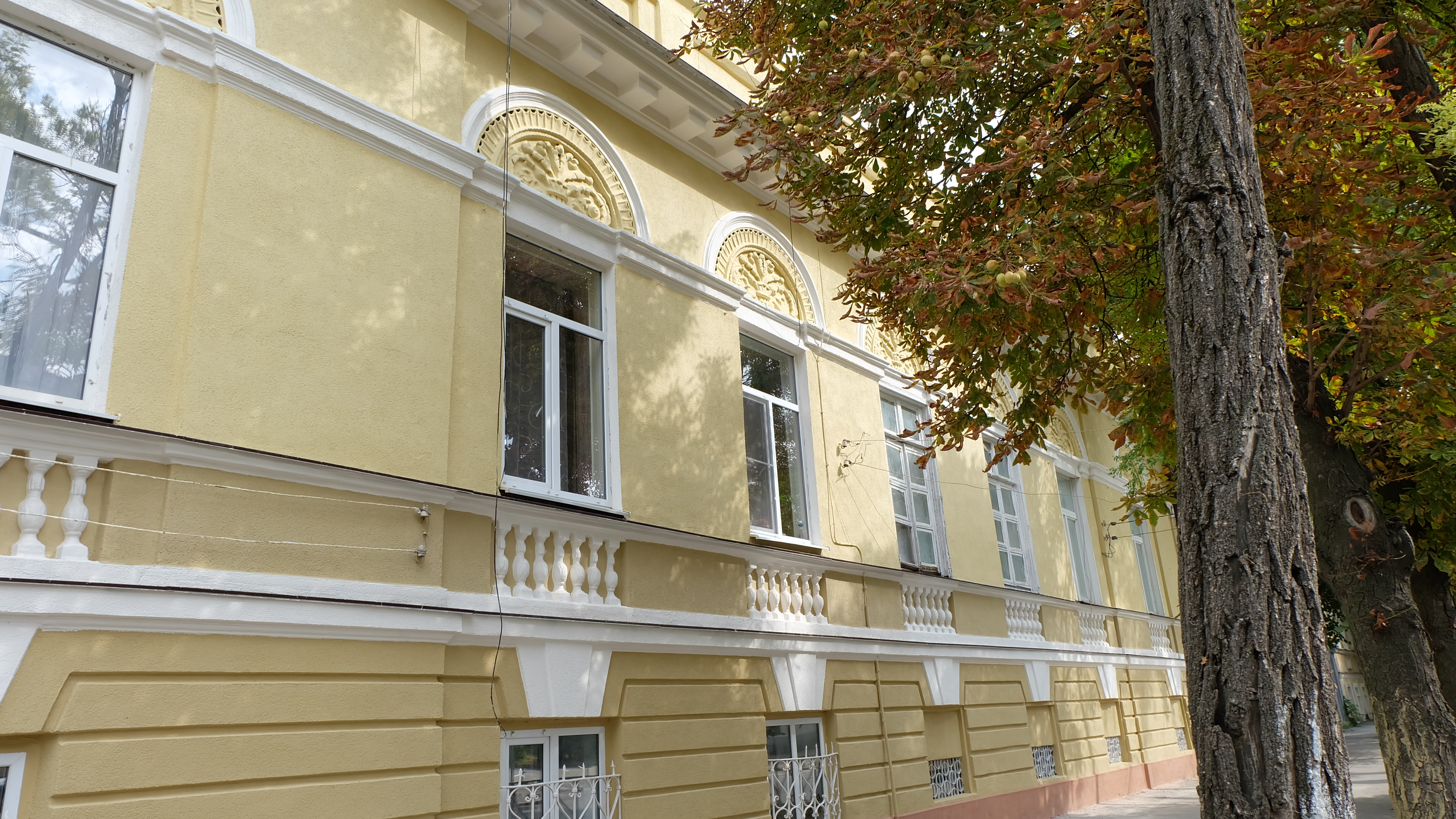

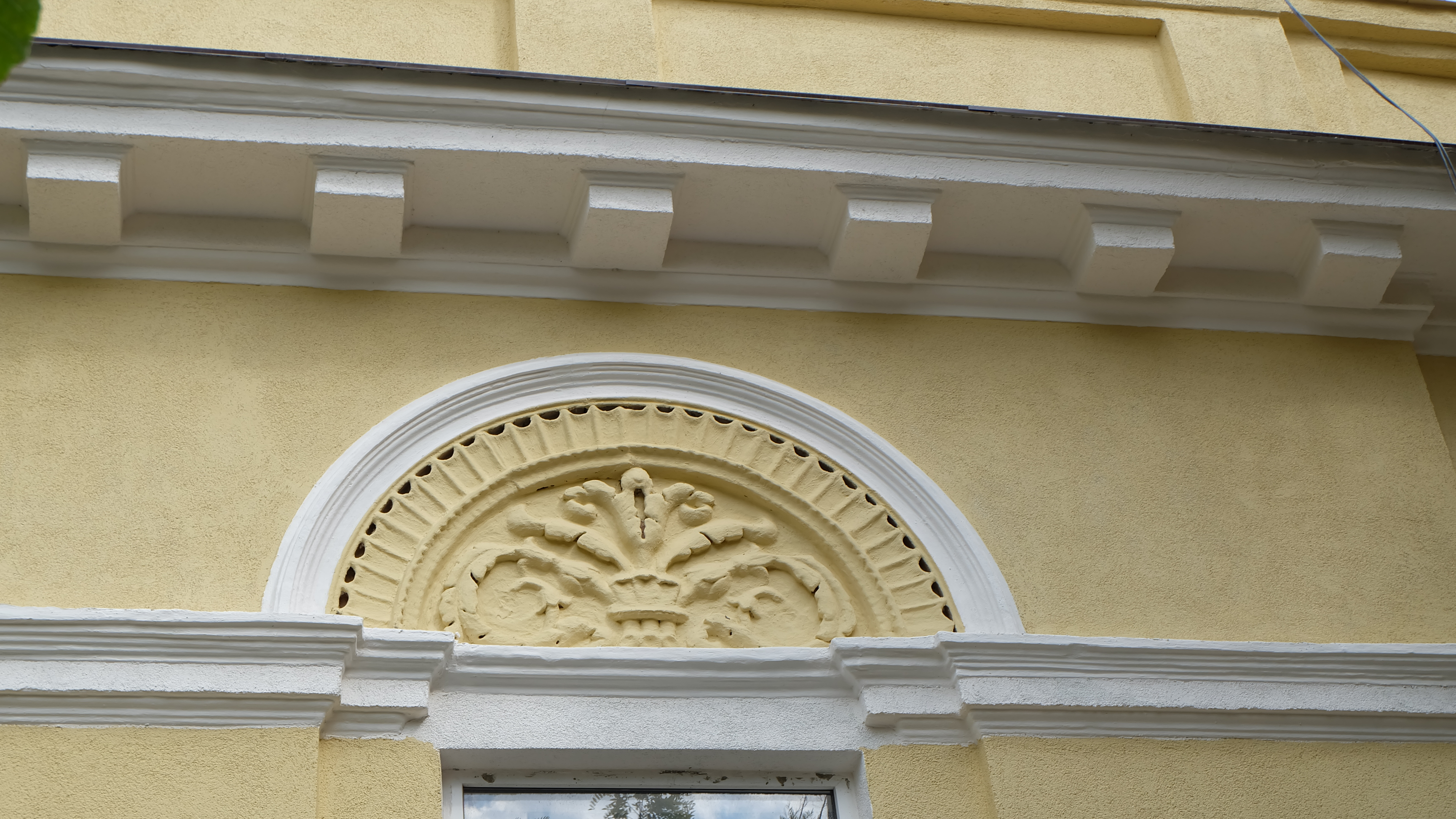
