= Juńczyk coat of arms =

Polish coat of arms

Juńczyk
- Alternative name: Junczyk
- Earliest mention: 13th century
- Families: Apostoł, Boguszewski, Bohuszewski, Bolesławski, Bołdyk, Bołdysz, Dobrzański, Drohomierecki, Enczyk, Flodzyński, Gomontowicz, Inczyk, Jamont, Jamonth, Jasewicz, Jassewicz, Jucewicz, Juchniewicz, Jucowicz, Juniewicz, Juńczyk, Juński, Pietrykowski, Pietrzykowski, Rostocki, Rostowski, Rzętkowski, Skrutkowski, Szulce, Szulecki, Szyryński-Agiszewicz, Wabiszczewicz, Waskiewicz

Juńczyk II
- Alternative name: Junczyk II
- Families: Boguszewski, Bolbas, Gołub, Krzyżanowski, Rostowski, Turkowski

Juńczyk (Junczyk, Iunczyk) is a Polish coat of arms. It was used by several szlachta families in the times of the Polish–Lithuanian Commonwealth.

== History ==
The Juńczyk coat of arms was created in the 13th century.

Aleksandr Lakier in his work from 1855 entitled The Russian Heraldry, in the part devoted to Polish heraldry, describes the Juńczyk coat of arms and gives the

following coat of arms legend:

...The origins of this emblem, as well as many others, date back to the times of paganism and its struggle with Christianity. They say that in one battle, when the enemy was with his forces on the bank of the river, a certain Juńczyk, having informed the Christian army of this, led him to the enemy and defeated him, as if he had captured him, on a hook. As a souvenir, Juńczyk received the described coat of arms.

— Alexander Lakier, Russian Heraldry; § 91. End of paragraph: coats of arms: Pomian-Jastrzębiec; no. 268

== Blazon ==
In the red field, a silver double cross torn into a mustache. Gem: five ostrich feathers.

== Juńczyk II coat of arms ==
=== Blazon ===
In the red field, a Latin cross torn into a mustache, silver. Jewel: three ostrich feathers.

== Gallery ==
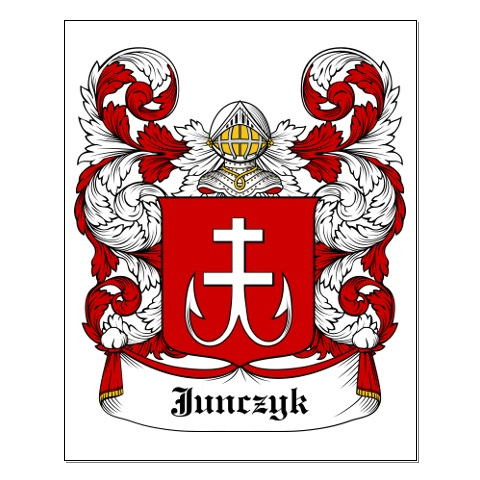

== See also ==
- Polish heraldry
- Heraldic family
- List of Polish nobility coats of arms
