= Waśkiewicz =

The Waśkiewicz variant of the Krucina coat of arms

Waśkiewicz or Waskiewicz is a Polish surname. Archaic feminine forms are Waśkiewiczowa or Waskiewiczowa (by husband), Waśkiewiczówna or Waskiewiczówna (by father); they still can be used colloquially. The holders of the surname often use the Juńczyk,Lubicz or the Waśkiewicz coat of arms. The surname is often transliterated as Waskewicz, Waskievich, Waskevich, Vaskiewicz, Vaskewicz, Vaskievich, Vaskevich, Васькевич, and Васкевич in different languages.

== People with the surname ==
- Andrzej Krzysztof Waśkiewicz (1941–2012), Polish poet, literary critic, editor, journalist, columnist, and author of radio plays
- Andrzej Waśkiewicz (born 1963) – Polish sociologist, professor and director of the Institute of Sociology at the Faculty of Philosophy and Sociology of the University of Warsaw
- Bolesław Waśkiewicz (1880–1940), colonel of infantry of the Polish Army, Knight of the Order of Virtuti Militari, victim of the Katyn massacre
- Jim Waskiewicz (born 1944), American football player
- Stanisław Waśkiewicz (1947–2012), Polish runner

== See also ==
- Waszkiewicz
