= Półkozic coat of arms =

Polish coat of arms

Półkozic
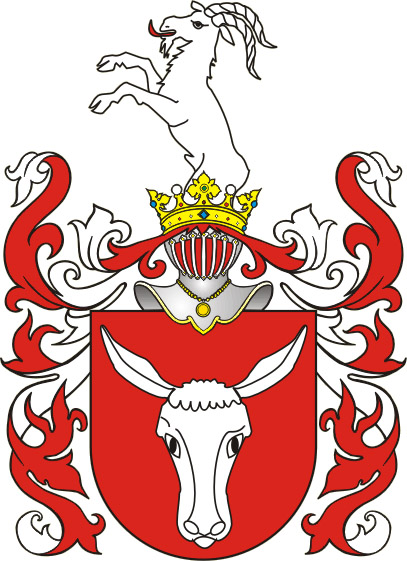
- Battle cry: Półkoza, Polukoza
- Alternative names: Osła głowa, Półkoza, Polukozicz, Zebro
- Earliest mention: 1370
- Towns: none
- Families: 157 names B Biały, Bietkowski, Błazowski, Błażowski, Błędowski, Bobrkowski, Bobryk, Bobrykowicz, Bobrzykiewicz, Bogumiłowicz, Bogumiłowski, Bogusz, Boguszewicz, Bohuszewicz, Borzęcki, Breński, Broniszowski, Brzostowski. C Chmielowski, Chorążyc, Czark, Czarkowski, Czarnej, Czarnek, Czarnkowski, Czyżowski. D Danielecki, Danikowski, Danilecki, Dankowski, Dańkowski, Dąbkowski, Demczyński, Dłuski, Dobroszewski, Dobryszowski, Dorniak. G Garliński, Giebułtowski, Gliwiński, Gostjowski, Gostyjowski, Gradowski, Grodowski, Gronvald, Gronwaldski, Grunwald, Gutowski. H Herecki, Horecki. I Indyk, Istmont. J Jeleniewicz, Jurkowski, Justimont, Justyment. K Korkliński, Koszuba, Krzywkowski, Kukwa, Kurdwanowski. L Laskowski, Leśnicki, Leśniewicz, Leśniewicz, Leśniowicz, Ligęza, Linksza. M Major, Mawolski, Mikołajewski, Minor, Młodecki, Młodnicki, Mołdawski, Mołodawski, Mołodecki, Moszgowy. N Nasiełowski, Nasiłowski, Nasiński, Nasiołowski, Niewiarowski, Niewierowicz, Niewierowski, Nikiel, Niwiński, Nowowiejski, Nykiel. O Obłąk, Obłąkowski, Obodyński. P Pachowski, Pekur, Perakładowski, Perekładowski, Petryk, Piestrzycki, Pikarski, Pikaski, Plichta, Pliszka, Płochut, Pobikrowski, Pogoski, Pohorski, Przemankowski, Przeradowski, Przesławski. R Rzeszowski. S Sepichowski, Sępichowski, Siestrzeniec, Siostrzeniec, Skotnicki, Sławiec, Smok, Sopichowski, Stamierowski, Stamirowski, Stawisz, Strygocki, Strygucki, Strzygocki, Swenderski, Swęderski, Szczaniecki, Szczekowski. Ś Śwenderski, Świdziński, Świeczka, Świeżyński. T Tabor, Taborowicz, Taworowski, Trzewliński. W Wąsicki, Wąszycki, Wanatowicz, Wielepnicki, Wielewiejski, Wielowiejski, Wielowieyski, Wilski, Włodek, Wojeński, Wolski, Wrocimowski, Wroćmirowski. Z Zagwojski, Zalasowski, Zalassowski, Zalaszowski, Zalazowski, Załazowski, Zasada, Zaszada, Ziemblicki, Złotczski. Ż Żenkiewicz.

Półkozic is a Polish coat of arms. It was used by several szlachta families in the times of the Polish–Lithuanian Commonwealth.

== History ==
According to legend, this coat was assigned to knight Stawisz, who was defending the foreign castle of Etecz (or Eczech) against the pagans. When besieged, he ordered to kill a goat and a donkey, and then use their blood to paint ox's hide. With this hide he then ordered to decorate the walls of the castle. The pagans, seeing that defenders had so much meat as to waste it, lifted the siege and left. The knight was rewarded by the king Bolesław I Chrobry with a coat of arms and returned to Poland.

The bearers of the coat were mentioned since early Piast era. Initially they were tied to the land of Lesser Poland, (regions of Sandomierz and Kraków), regions near Lublin, Rawa Mazowiecka, Sieradz and then Red Ruthenia. After the Union of Horodło bearers of the coat of arms appeared also in Lithuania.

== Blazon ==
Gules, donkeys head gardant Argent. Over the helm the crest composed of a goat passant proper Argent.

== Notable bearers ==
Notable bearers of this coat of arms include:

- House of Ligęza
- Jan son of Pakosław (owner of Rzeszów)- a valued diplomat of king Casimir III in many diplomatic missions including mission to pope Urban V
- Marcin of Wrocimowice - Standard-Bearer of the Territory of Kraków in the Battle of Grunwald
- Michał from Czyżowo - member of Royal council of Władysław II Jagiełło.
- The fictional family of Horeszko from the epic poem Pan Tadeusz by Adam Mickiewicz were bearers of Półkozic Coat of Arms.
- Mikołaj Wolski
- Baron Grunwald family, one out of two brothers Ligęza who purchased and owned the Grunwald village Battle of Grunwald where the Battle stand. He liked the village name so much so he changed his name after the village. Standard bearer of own regiment size force at the Battle. The last Baron Grunwald died in Warszawa 1981, ending his House.
- Jan Rzeszowski, medieval bishop
- Jan Kazimierz Młodecki (Sometimes Mołodecki) - Owner of the Brody, Warkowicze, Werba, Satniów, Serniki estates, president of the Volhynian Main Court, marshal of the nobility in Dubno, and Knight of Malta.

== Gallery ==
Coat of Arms of Władysław Wielowieyski (1825)

Variant Jeski II (1630)

Coat of Arms of Machnicki i Sawnowski family

Coat of Arms of Maskiewicz family (1676)

Coat of Arms of Radziejowski family

Coat of Arms of Utratowski family(1662)

Coat of Arms of Justimonti family (1589)
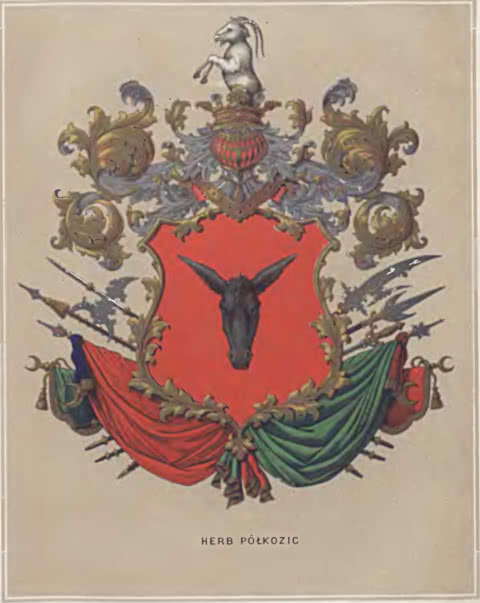

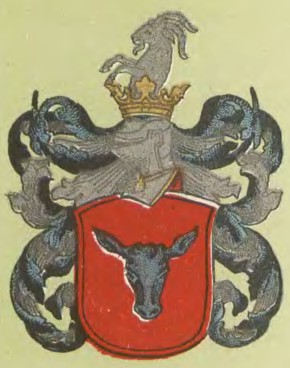

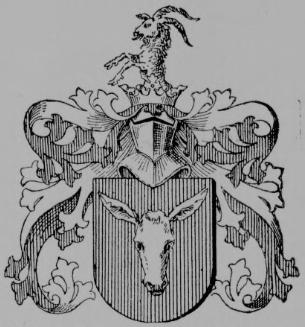

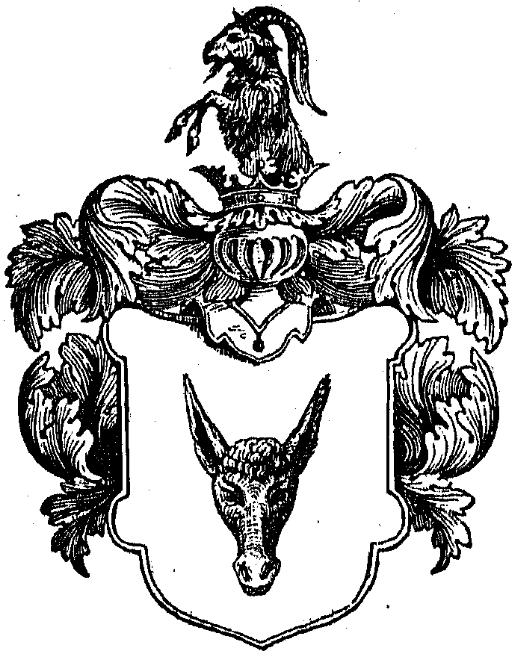

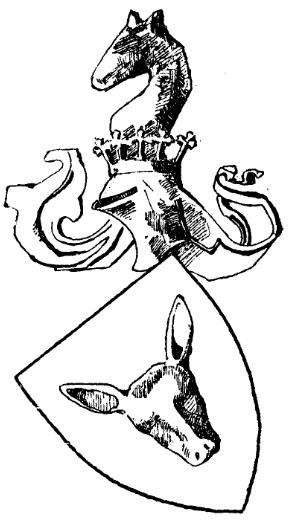

== See also ==
- Półkozic
- Polish heraldry
- Heraldry
- Coat of Arms

== Bibliography ==
- Alfred Znamierowski: Herbarz rodowy. Warszawa: Świat Książki, 2004, s. 151. ISBN 83-7391-166-9.
- Tadeusz Gajl: Herbarz polski od średniowiecza do XX wieku : ponad 4500 herbów szlacheckich 37 tysięcy nazwisk 55 tysięcy rodów. L&L, 2007. ISBN 978-83-60597-10-1.
