= Malyn, Rivne Oblast =

Village in Rivne oblast, Ukraine

Malyn Малин
- Village
- Location within Rivne Oblast Location within Ukraine
- Coordinates: 50°39′23″N 25°38′22″E
- Country: Ukraine
- Oblast: Rivne Oblast
- Raion: Dubno Raion
- Hromada: Ostrozhets rural hromada
- Founded: 1444 (first mention)

Population
  - Total: 350
- Time zone: UTC+2 (EET)
  - Summer (DST): UTC+3 (EEST)
- Postal code: 35114
- Area code: +380 3659
- Website: www.rada.info/rada/04386723/

Malyn (ukr. Малин) is a village in the Dubno Raion of the Rivne Oblast, Ukraine. As of 2016 the village has 350 inhabitants.

== History ==
The first written mention of the village was in 1444. In 1871 a Czech colony was established on it, called Český Malin, and later Kolonia Malin. In the Second Polish Republic the village was the seat of the rural municipality of Malin in the Dubien district of the Volhynia Voivodeship.

On 13 July 1943 a strong German punitive expedition, sent from nearby Ołyka, pacified the village of Malin (also "Malin Russky" or "Ukrainian Malin") and the neighbouring village of Kolonia Malin (also "Bohemian Malin"). According to witnesses, the punitive expedition also included Polish Schutzmannschaft officers and armed civilians, but it is not known whether they took part in the murder of the inhabitants or only in the looting of the village. The inhabitants were shot or burned alive. A total of 532 people were killed during the pacification - including 374 Volhynian Czechs, 132 Ukrainians and 26 Poles. Among the victims were many women and children.

On 13 July 1947, the municipality of Frankštát (German: Frankstadt) in the Šumperk region was renamed Nový Malín ("new Malín").

Malyn belonged to Mlyniv Raion until it was abolished and its territory was merged into Dubno Raion on 18 July 2020 as part of the administrative reform of Ukraine, which reduced the number of raions of Rivne Oblast to four.

== See also ==
- Czechs in Ukraine
