= Malin massacre =

1943 event during World War 2

- Part of World War II
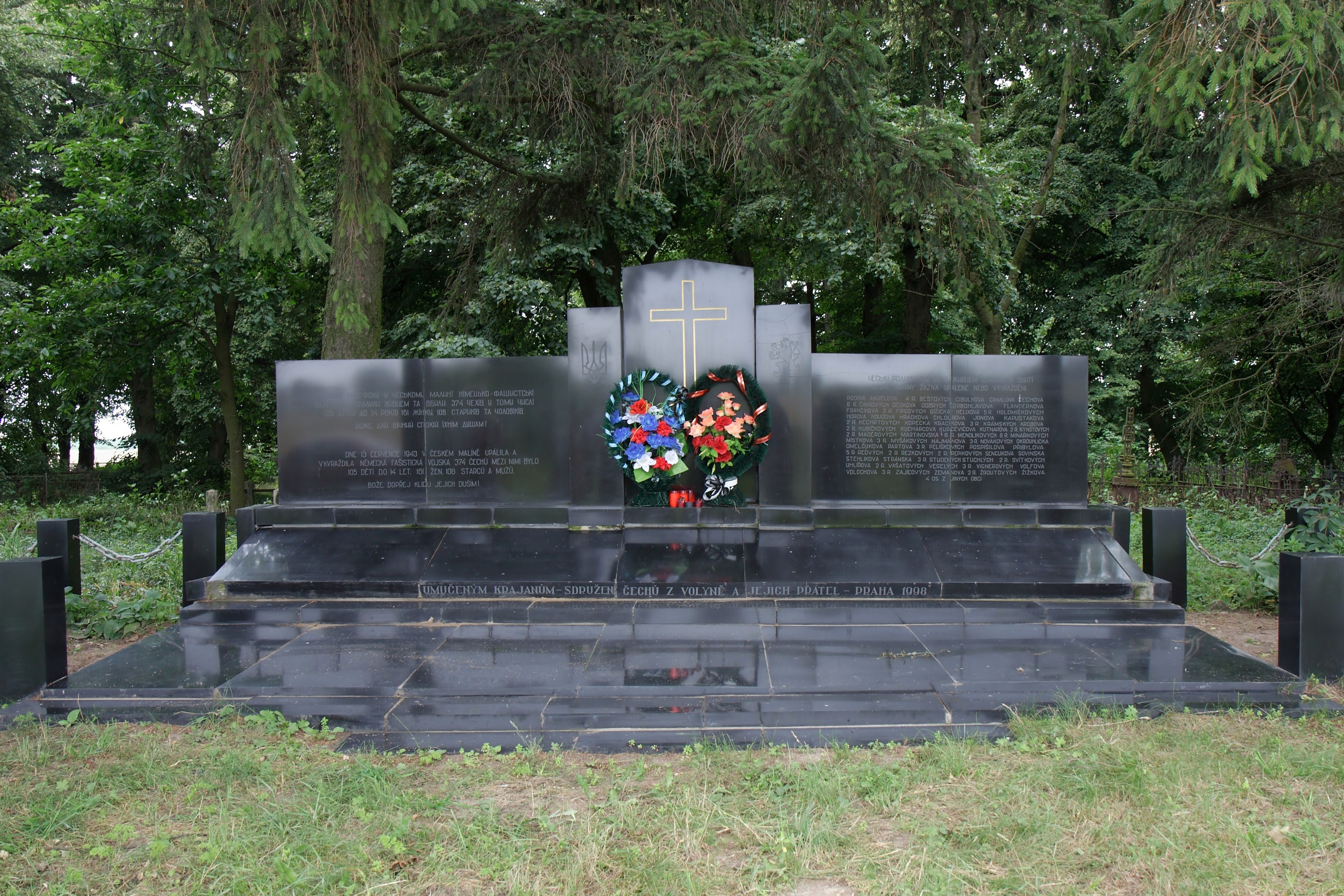
- memorial to Czech victims in Malin
- Location: Malin
- Date: 13 July 1943
- Deaths: 532–603
- Victims: Polish, Ukrainian and Czech civilians
- Perpetrators: SS, Schutzmannschaft
- Assailants: SS, Schutzmannschaft
- Motive: Nazi Germany's policy

The Malin massacre consisted of mass killings and looting committed on 13 July 1943 by Germans and policemen from the collaborationist auxiliary police in the village of Malin, in the Dubien district of the pre-war Volhynia Voivodeship. The crimes resulted in the deaths of between 532 and 603 people, mainly the Czechs, Ukrainians and Poles.

== Background ==
Malin is a village in the Dubien district, formerly part of the Volhynia voivodeship. First documented in 1545, the village's name likely derives from an early settler named Malynsky. Limited historical records from the 16th and 17th centuries mention Malin in correspondence between Polish landowners and the Orthodox Church. In the 1860s and 1870s, a wave of Czech immigrants arrived in Malin, causing the village to split into two ethnic enclaves - Malin Czeski (Czech Malin) and Malin Ruski (Ukrainian Malin).

Approximately fifteen thousand Czech peasants moved to Malin between 1868 and 1874 due to land shortages in Bohemia. The Tsarist government encouraged this settlement to weaken Polish landowner influence and stimulate regional economic development. The Czechs integrated well, bringing agricultural expertise and capital, and coexisted peacefully with Ukrainians and other minorities. By the early 20th century, more than 25,000 Czechs lived in Volhynia. In 1871, twenty Czech families from Rakovník, Žatec, and Louna settled in Malin, expanding to 900 people by 1889. Despite economic disparities, there was no ethnic hostility between Czechs and Ukrainians before World War II.

After the end of the Polish-Bolshevik war in 1921, Volhynia and Malin became part of the Second Polish Republic. Although tensions between Poles and Ukrainians increased in the Second Republic, many Malin Czechs considered this period to be peaceful and productive. Czech Malin received cultural and financial support from the Czechoslovak government, which contributed to further economic development. Along with technology, new political ideas also came to Malin. The Ukrainians in Malyn were heavily influenced by communist ideas, which introduced tensions in the region. After the start of the Second World War, the Soviet Union occupied Volhynia and Ukrainian nationalists attacked Polish officials in Malin.

In 1943 Malin was located in German-occupied territory (Reich Commissariat Ukraine, General District Volhynia-Podolia, Commissariat Dubno). The nearest police station and the seat of the community were in Ostrowiec. In the face of the Massacres of Poles in Volhynia and Eastern Galicia, the Czech population of Malin remained neutral.

A week before the massacre the Malin area was overrun by Soviet partisans under the command of Sydir Kovpak. During their 12-hour stay in Malin, the partisans organised a rally and proclaimed a resolution that these lands belonged to the USSR. According to Władysław and Ewa Siemaszko, the partisans' visit was the supposed reason for the pacification that followed. The version stating that the village was pacified in retaliation for supporting the Ukrainian nationalist underground, according to Jared McBride, is not supported by any evidence. (Note: McBride also considers as unfounded the information appearing in contemporary Ukrainian publications that the UPA tried to defend the people of Malin during the pacification, see McBride 2016, pp. 30–31.)

== Description of the Massacre ==
On the morning of 13 July 1943 the pacification squad arrived in Malin by car from Olyka. A committee headed by Jaroslav Procházka estimated the size of the punitive expedition at 1,500 men. At the sight of the German soldiers, the inhabitants of Malin Russky, mainly Ukrainians, began to flee, and the attackers opened fire on the fleeing people. Later, during the pacification of Malin Russky, the attackers moved to Czech Malin. In Malin, the Germans visited every farm, driving people out of their homes under the pretext of checking documents, not sparing children, the sick and the crippled. They explained that they were looking for partisans who were supposed to be hiding in the village. The Germans discovered and captured several partisans being treated in the local hospital. In the afternoon, the captured inhabitants of Malin Czeski were led to Malin Ruski and gathered together with the Ukrainians. There, documents were checked again, dividing people into groups according to sex, age and nationality. Most of the Czech women with children and old people were returned to Malin Czeski and, after being locked in barns, mainly in Josef Dobry's farmyard, were burnt.

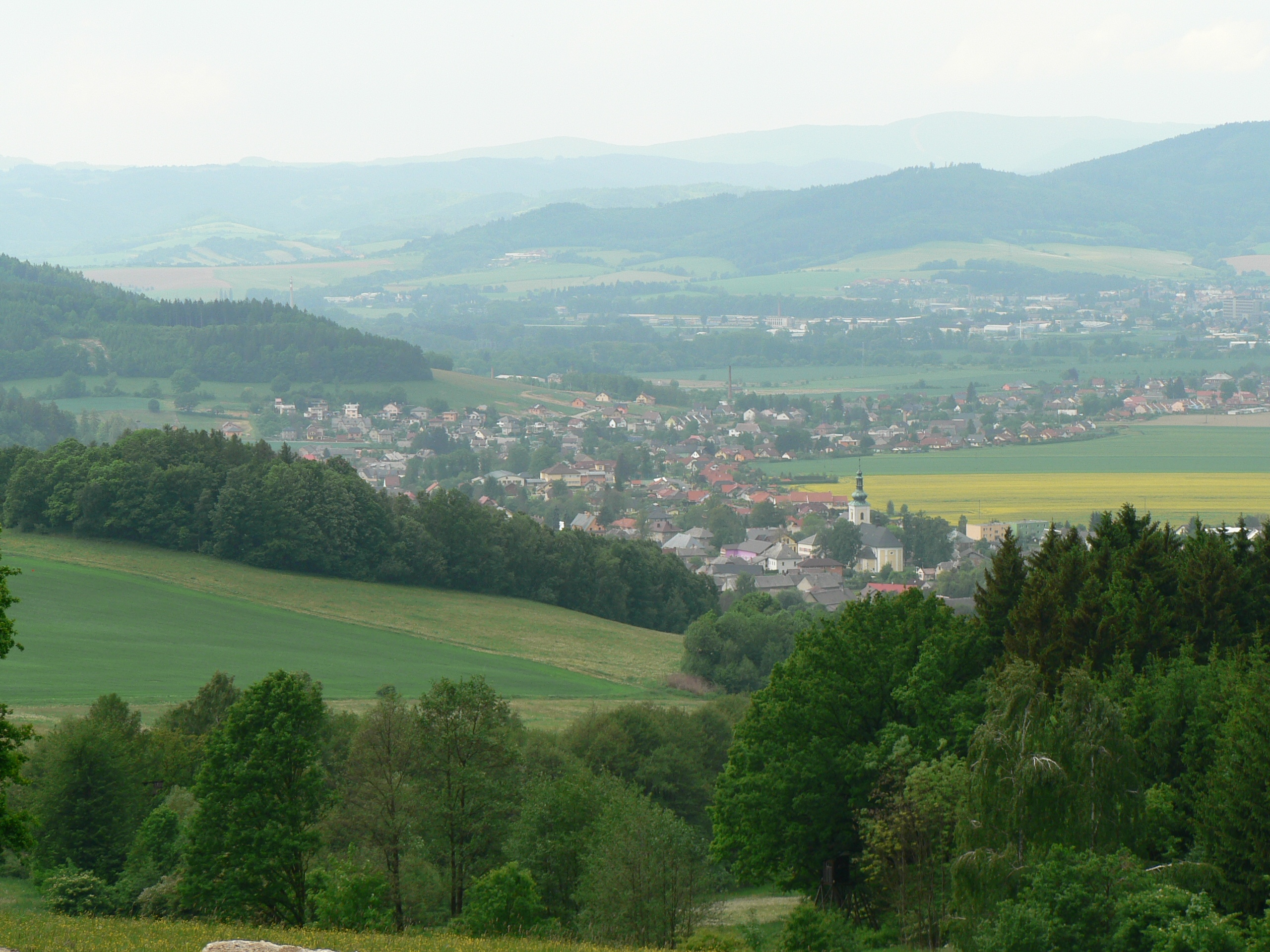
Nový Malín on the photo from east

50 or 80 people, mostly Czech men, were locked up in a school building in Malin Ruski, which was then burnt down with the people. About 155 people, mostly Ukrainian men, were imprisoned in an Orthodox church, which was pelted with grenades and fired at with machine guns. In addition, around 90 women, children and old people were burned in two nearby barns. Bedridden patients from the hospital in Malin Czeski were dragged to Bedřich Činka's barn and also burnt. According to the report of the Procházka Commission, during the pacification, women with children begging on their knees for sparing their lives were killed; children were impaled on bayonets and thrown into the fire. Grenades were thrown into rooms where people were hiding, and shots were fired at those fleeing the flames. The screams of burning victims carried to the Polish colony of Zamczysko, 1 km away.

According to the Procházka commission's report, 532 people fell victim to the pacification: 374 Czechs, 132 Ukrainians and 26 Poles. According to the materials of the Soviet Extraordinary State Commission to Investigate the Crimes of the German-Fascist Invaders, 603 people died in Malin, including 194 men, 204 women and 205 children. There were 3 survivors from the massacre in Malin Czeski, who managed to escape from the burning buildings, and 38–41 boys and men who were spared by the Germans and sent to Ołyka and Pyany with looted belongings. Also surviving were Olga Trichleb with several patients, hidden in the basement of the hospital, and Ludmila Činková, who escaped from a group turned back to the Czech part of Malin and hid in the garden.

After the looting (442 cows, 130 horses, 870 pigs and 170 sheep), most of the colony's buildings were burnt down; a total of 68 houses and 223 farm buildings were destroyed. The remains of the victims were buried in a mass grave.

A week after the massacre the Germans declared at a meeting of the chiefs of the Młynów municipality and their deputies that the pacification of Malin Czeski was a "mistake", as the order concerned only Malin Ruski. Siemaszko's and Grzegorz Motyka agree that the original target of the punitive expedition was Malin Ruski and its Ukrainian inhabitants. However, it is not clear why the executioners moved to Malin Czeski during the pacification. Siemaszko's speculate that the Ukrainian policemen who participated in the crime, not wanting to kill their compatriots, directed the pacification to Malin Czeski. Motyka, on the other hand, puts forward the hypothesis that the Germans, having realised on the spot the wealth of the Czechs, decided to include Malin Czeski in the operation.

== Perpetrators ==
It is indisputable that the crime was directed by the Germans and they formed the core of the punitive expedition (SS unit). The fact of the crime was investigated by a Czechoslovak commission headed by Jaroslav Procházka on the orders of General Ludvík Svoboda. In a report drawn up on 3 April 1944, the commission established the responsibility of the Germans for the crime, without going into the national composition of the criminal expedition. Procházka's commission indicated that Germans were among those carrying out the pacification: kreislandwirtleutnant Friedrich Vogl, Martin Levandovský and a policeman named Málek.

Controversy surrounds the national composition of the collaborationist auxiliary police involved in the massacre. According to McBride, most Ukrainian sources accuse Poles of involvement in the crime, while most Polish sources accuse Ukrainians. Siemaszkos state that the Germans were supported by the Ukrainian police and a small unit of so-called Vlasov soldiers. They exclude Polish policemen from the group of perpetrators, relying among others on the statement of Jarosław Mec, a representative of the Volhynian Czechs. Ukrainian authors, on the other hand, relying exclusively on Ukrainian sources, accuse only Poles (or Uzbeks as well) of aiding in the crime. (Note: One Ukrainian author who accuses only Poles of involvement in this crime is Volodymyr Vyatrovych, despite the fact that, according to McBride, this author is aware of the controversy surrounding the composition of the punitive expedition operating in Malin – see. McBride 2016 ↓, p. 67, fn. 131. Volodymyr V'iatrovych has also been criticised for his selective approach to sources in the case of the Malin crime by Per Anders Rudling and Grzegorz Hryciuk – see Per Anders Rudling, Warfare or War Criminality? Volodymyr V'iatrovych, Druha pol's'ko-ukains'ka viina, 1942–1947 (Kyiv: Vydavnychyi dim "Kyevo-Mohylians'ka akademiia," 2011). 228 pp. ISBN 978-966-518-567, Ab Imperio, 1/2012, p. 368; and: Grzegorz Hryciuk, book review: Volodymyr Viatrovych, Druha polśko-ukrajinśka wijna 1942–1947, [in:] "Memory and Justice" No. 21, p. 461.)

Grzegorz Motyka, taking into account Ukrainian accounts, expressed the assumption that the Polish unit taking part in the pacification of Malin may have been small and may have been operating only in Malin Ruski, and therefore the Czechs may not have noticed its presence at the scene of the crime. Both Motyka and Siemaszkos considered that a final decision on whether Poles took part in the Malin crime depends on reaching German documents.

McBride offers a different explanation for the controversy that occurred. He notes that in testimony before the Procházka commission, Czech witnesses provided information about the nationality of the collaborators involved in the crime, but this was not included in the commission's report. Josef Martinovský, who was in the group of people sent with the looted property to Olyka, testified:

There were several soldiers who spoke good Polish. One spoke Czech, but was in the black uniform of a Ukrainian policeman. Some of them also spoke Russian. Others were Poles in civilian clothes but with guns.... Some Poles from the German protective police (Schutzpolizei) from Ołyka were also involved in destroying houses and looting property.

Václav Kinšt testified that among the perpetrators there was "probably" a Pole from the village of Bozkiewicze named Paczkowski. Jan Činka recognised Russians ("White Guardsmen") and Poles from Narutovka among the perpetrators. Antonín Žrout also remembered Ukrainians in black Schutzmannschaft uniforms. Martinovský wrote in his Kronika Českého Malina (Chronicle of Czech Malin), published a year later, that the co-perpetrators of the crime were "renegades of both nations – Ukraine and Poland".

According to McBride both Polish and Ukrainian police officers were most likely involved in the crime, and the collaborationist police unit operating in Malin may even have had a multinational composition. The contradiction between the 'Polish version' and the 'Ukrainian version' of the Malin's tragedy is explained by tendency to suppress from memory the facts of crimes committed by people of his own nationality. (Note: McBride also questions the credibility of the statement by Jaroslaw Mec, whose ties to Poland (origin from a mixed Polish-Czech family and studies in Poland) and communist past would lead him to blame only Ukrainians – see McBride 2016, p. 38.) However, like Motyka and Siemaszkos, McBride believes that a definitive determination of which German unit carried out the crime and with whose help depends on reaching German documents.

== Commemorate ==
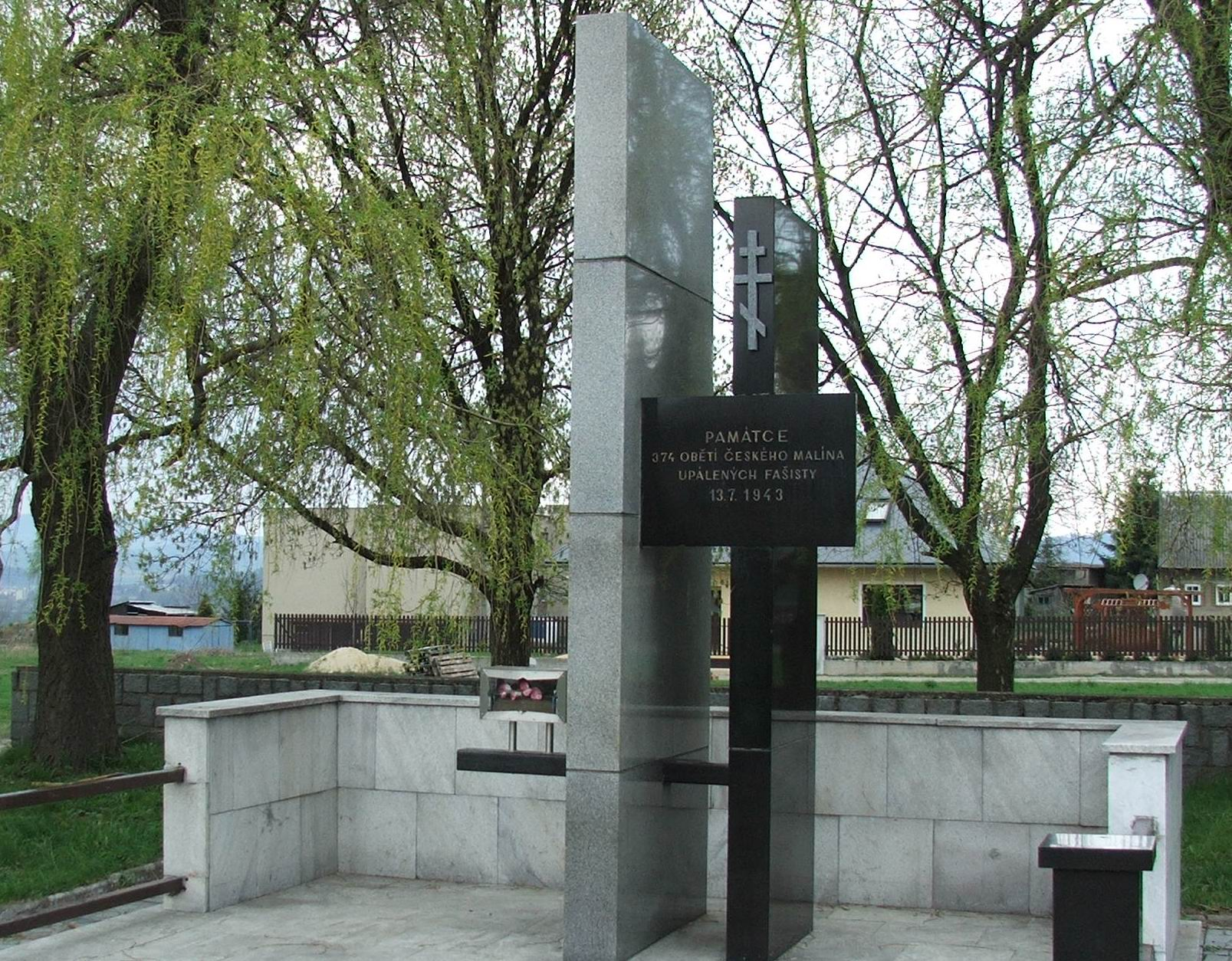
Memorial to the murdered in Nový Malín

After the war 33,000 Volhynian Czechs were forcibly resettled in Czechoslovakia. The repatriates cultivated the memory of Malin, often referred to as the "Volyn Lidice" (a similar event took place there in 1942). The history of Malin was described by Josef Martinovský in his book Kronika Českého Malína, published in 1945. In 1946, a memorial to the crime was unveiled in the Czech town of Žatec. In 1947, as a tribute to Malín, the Czechoslovak authorities renamed the municipality of Frankštát as Nový Malín.

In the USSR the Malin tragedy became a symbol of the common suffering of "brotherly nations" used by Soviet propaganda. In 1972, the authorities erected a monument at the site of the crime.

Today (2013) there are several monuments in Malin. In the former Czech cemetery, there is a black marble monument whose plaque lists the names of only Czech victims. On the site where the burnt Orthodox church stood and where the mass grave of the victims is located, there is a steel sculpture in the shape of a flame with the date of the crime, and opposite it a cross with a plaque listing Ukrainian nationalists and Ukrainian victims of the massacre. A Soviet Great Patriotic War memorial also stands in the centre of Malin.

=== Exploitation of crime by propaganda ===
The fact of the crime was first mentioned in UPA leaflets in September 1943. In 1945, the UPA again referred to the Malin crime in its leaflets, accusing "Polish imperialists" and Germans of perpetrating it. According to the document, 850 Ukrainians were to be killed; Czech victims were not mentioned.

In 1959 the Soviet authorities excavated 12 trenches in and around Malin, in which it was claimed that the remains of over 200 people had been found. The authorities gave the excavated remains a demonstrative funeral with the participation of the local population, and accused "Ukrainian bourgeois nationalists" of the crime. The unfounded accusation of the OUN of the Malin crime was included in the Soviet pamphlet Judas's Breed distributed in the West in the 1970s. In the English-language collection History Teaches a Lesson, published in 1986, the Soviet publisher committed forgery by correcting the content of the document (Bishop Platon's letter) so that it identified "Ukrainian nationalists" as the perpetrators of the Malin crime.

In response to the joint commemoration of the 60th anniversary of the Volhynian massacre by Aleksander Kwaśniewski and Leonid Kuchma in 2003, Ukrainian nationalist organisations distributed a leaflet accusing the 102nd and 107th battalions of the Schutzmannschaft, composed of Poles, of perpetrating the Malin crime.

== Bibliography ==
- Siemaszko, Władysław, Ewa (2000). Ludobójstwo dokonane przez nacjonalistów ukraińskich na ludności polskiej Wołynia 1939-1945. Warsaw: von borowiecky. ISBN 83-87689-34-3.
- McBride, Jared (2016). "Contesting the Malyn Massacre: The Legacy of Inter-Ethnic Violence and the Second World War in Eastern Europe". The Carl Beck Papers in Russian and East European Studies (2405).
- Motyka, Grzegorz (2006). Ukraińska partyzantka 1942-1960. Działalność Organizacji Ukraińskich Nacjonalistów i Ukraińskiej Powstańczej Armii. Warsaw: Institute of Political Studies of the Polish Academy of Sciences, Oficyna Wydawnicza RYTM. ISBN 83-87689-34-3.
