= Boguszewski =

Ostoja coat of arms used by some of Boguszewski family

Boguszewski (feminine: Boguszewska) is a Polish surname. Some of them use: Juńczyk or Ostoja coat of arms. Notable people with the surname include:

- Helena Boguszewska (1883–1978), Polish writer, columnist and social activist
- Krzysztof Boguszewski (died 1635), Polish painter
- Modest Boguszewski (born 1963), Polish footballer
- Paweł Boguszewski, Polish guitarists of punk band The Analogs
- Stefan Boguszewski (1877–1938), Polish political activist, senator of Second Polish Republic

== See also ==
- Boguszewicz
- Bohuszewicz
