= Stefan Lech Sokołowski =

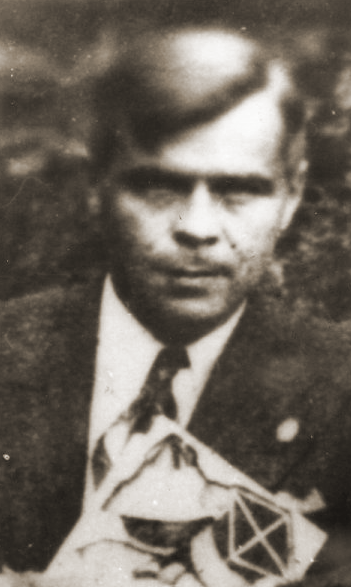
- Born: 25 May 1904; Warsaw, Russian Empire
- Died: spring 1940 Katyń, Soviet Union
- Buried: Katyn war cemetery
- Allegiance: Second Polish Republic
- Branch: Polish Land Forces
- Service years: 1919, 1933, 1939
- Rank: porucznik
- Conflicts: Battle of Lemberg (1918–1919), Invasion of Poland
- Awards: Silver Cross of the Virtuti Militari (nr 14384;11 November 1976); Cross of the September Campaign (1 July 1986)

Stefan Lech Sokołowski (Gozdawa coat of arms) (25 May 1904- spring 1940) was a Polish mathematician, climber and lieutenant (porucznik_{[pl]}) of artillery in the Polish Land Forces. He was aLwów Eaglet, a group of children who defended the city of Lviv in 1918-1919 during the Polish-Ukrainian War. He was also a Doctor of mathematical sciences. He died as a result of the Katyn massacre, a Soviet massacre of Polish military officers in 1940.

== Life ==
Sokołowski was born on 25 May 1904 in Warsaw in the family of railway engineer and inventor, Witold Sokołowski (1871–1944), who used the Gozdawa coat of arms, and writer Anna Maria Sokołowska, née Skarbek (1878–1972). In 1912 with his mother and sisters, he moved to Myślenice, Poland. When he was less than fifteen years old, he fought in the defence of Polish Lviv (Lwów).

After the war he studied mathematics at the University of Warsaw. He worked in the Ballistic Research Center in Rembertów (Polish: Centrum Badań Balistycznych w Rembertowie) during the interwar period. He received a PhD in mathematics, before graduating in 1933 from the School Reserve Officer Cadet Artillery in Włodzimierz. On 1 January 1935 he was promoted to porucznik, the Polish equivalent of a Lieutenant. In 1939, he was assigned to the staff of OK I.

== Murder ==
In the spring of 1940, he was murdered by members of the NKVD (People's Commissariat for Internal Affairs and de facto secret service) in the Katyn forest, during the Katyn Massacre, the series of mass executions of nearly 22,000 Polish military officers and prisoners of war carried out by the Soviet Union in April and May 1940.

== Awards ==
- Silver Cross of the Virtuti Militari (nr 14384) – collective posthumous honor of Polish soldiers murdered in Katyn and other unknown places of execution granted by the President of Poland in Exile Stanisław Ostrowski (11 November 1976)
- Cross of September Campaign 1939 – the collective posthumous medal commemorative given to all the victims of the Katyn massacre on 1 July 1986

== Family ==
He had three sisters: Maria Danuta Żelazowska (died 1933), podpułkownik Grażyna Lipińska (1902–1995) and psychologist and a Home Army soldier, Stefania Żelazowska (1907–1992).

In 1931 he married Cecylia (or Celina) Benisz. They had one daughter – Krystyna (born 1935).
