= Jankiewicz =

Jankiewicz is a Polish surname. Notable people with the surname include:

- Jan Jankiewicz (born 1955), Polish cyclist
- Tom Jankiewicz (1963–2013), American screenwriter
- Pat Jankiewicz (born 1965), American author and film historian

== See also ==
- Jackiewicz
