= Mikołaj Wolski =

Polish magnate, Court Marshal and diplomat

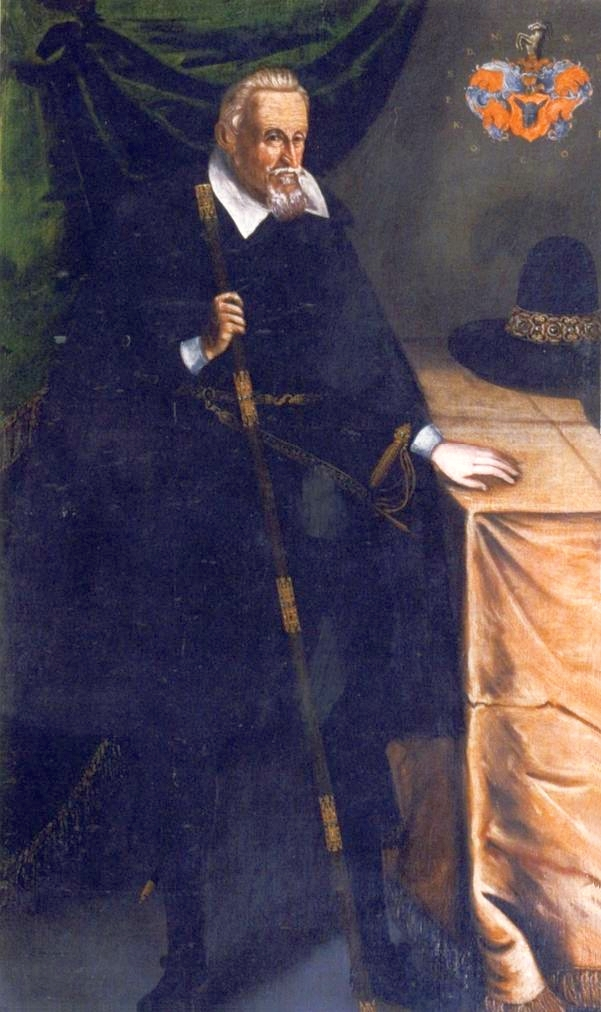
1624 painting

Mikołaj Wolski (1553–1630), bearer of the Półkozic coat of arms, was a Polish magnate, Court Marshal (1600-1616), Crown Grand Marshal (1616–1630), and a diplomat of the Polish–Lithuanian Commonwealth. Wolski was also the starost of Krzepice and Olsztyn. He founded the first Polish Camaldolese Monastery - Hermitage of Silver Mountain in Bielany near Kraków.
