= Boguszewicz =

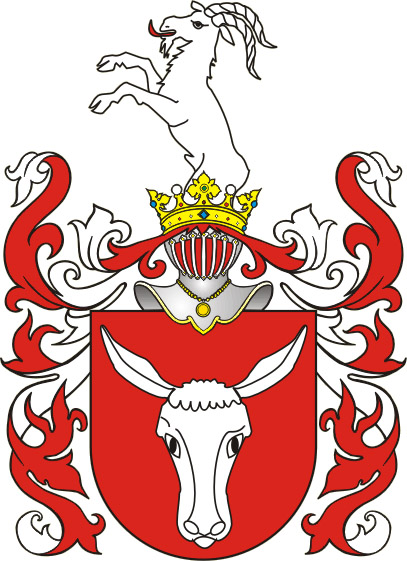
Półkozic coat of arms used by some of Boguszewicz family

Boguszewicz is a Polish patronymic surname derived from the given name Bogusz/Bohush. Archaic feminine forms are Boguszewiczowa (by husband), Boguszewiczówna(by father); they still can be used colloquially. Some of them use: Gozdawa, Odrowąż, Ostoja or Półkozic. In Lithuanian Boguševičius, Boguševičienė, Boguševičiūtė. Notable people with the surname include:

- Czesław Boguszewicz (born 1950), Polish footballer and manager
- Lech Boguszewicz (1938–2010), Polish athlete

== See also ==
- Bohuszewicz
- Boguszewski
