= Bohuszewicz =

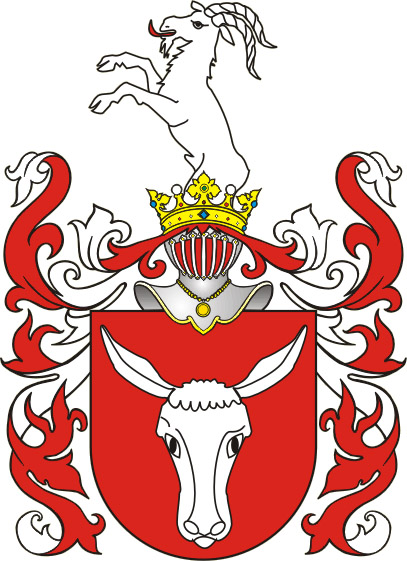
Półkozic coat of arms used by some of Bohuszewicz family

Bohuszewicz (feminine: Bohuszewiczowa, Bohuszewiczówna) is a Polish surname. Some of them use: Gozdawa, Odrowąż, Ostoja or Półkozic. Notable people with the surname include:

- Jan Bohuszewicz (1878–1935), Polish painter
- Franciszek Bohuszewicz (1840–1900), Polish-Belarusian poet, writer and lawyer
- Maria Bohuszewiczówna (1865–1887), Polish revolutionary and a leader of the First Proletariat
- Stanisław Bohuszewicz (1751–1817) – Polish land judge of Mińsk, colonel of the Crown, member of the Partition Sejm
- Władysław Bohuszewicz (1897–1956), Polish colonel of the Polish Army, Knight of the Order of Virtuti Militari

== See also ==
- Boguszewicz
- Bahuševič
- Bogušević
