= Nový Malín =

- Municipality
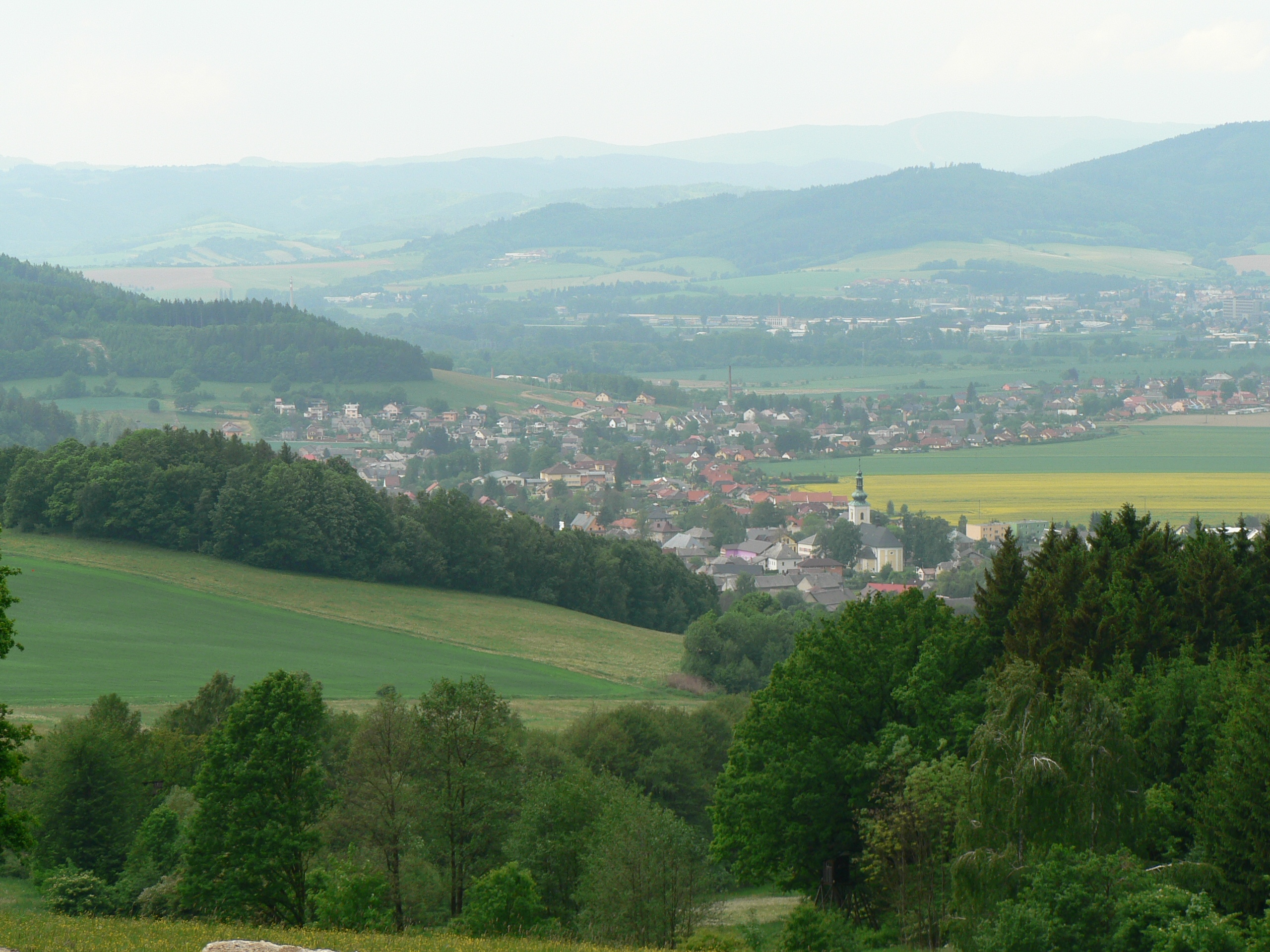
- View from the east

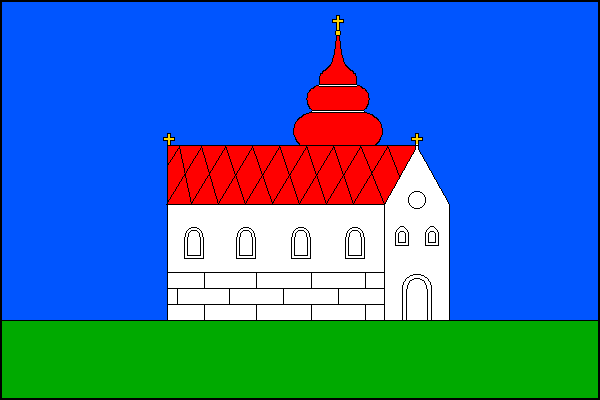
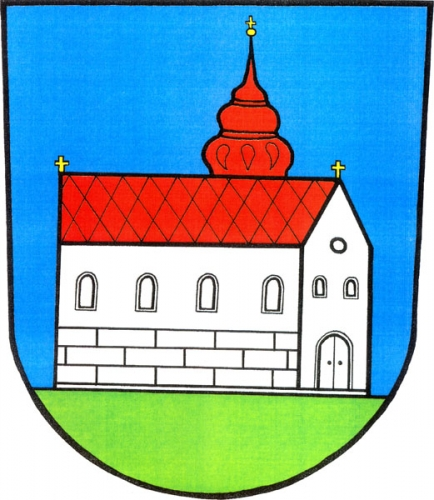
- Flag Coat of arms

- Location in the Czech Republic
- Coordinates: 49°56′34″N 17°1′55″E
- Country: Czech Republic
- Region: Olomouc
- District: Šumperk
- First mentioned: 1350

Area
  - Total: 27.33 km^{2} (10.55 sq mi)
- Elevation: 317 m (1,040 ft)

Population (2026-01-01)
  - Total: 3,637
  - Density: 133.1/km^{2} (344.7/sq mi)
- Time zone: UTC+1 (CET)
  - Summer (DST): UTC+2 (CEST)
- Postal code: 788 03
- Website: www.novymalin.cz

Nový Malín (Czech pronunciation: [ˈnoviː ˈmaliːn]; until 1947 Frankštát; German: Frankstadt) is a municipality and village in Šumperk District in the Olomouc Region of the Czech Republic. It has about 3,600 inhabitants.

== Administrative division ==
Nový Malín consists of three municipal parts (in brackets population according to the 2021 census):

- Nový Malín (3,028)
- Mladoňov (214)
- Plechy (225)

== Etymology ==
The initial German name of the village Frankstadt was derived from the personal name Frank, who was probably its founder. The Czech name Frankštát was created by transcription of the German name.

After World War II, the municipality was renamed to Nový Malín ('new Malín') in honour of Malyn/Český Malín. It was a Czech village in Volhynia (today's Mlyniv Raion in Ukraine) destroyed by Nazis (with the help of Poles or Polish speakers) on 13 July 1943, with 374 Czechs being killed.

== Geography ==
Nový Malín is located about 4 kilometres (2 mi) southeast of Šumperk and 41 km (25 mi) north of Olomouc. It lies in the Hanušovice Highlands. The highest point is the mountain Kamenný vrch at 964 m (3,163 ft) above sea level. The built-up area is situated in the valley of the stream Malínský potok.

== History ==
The first written mention of Frankštát is from 1350. In 1398, it was referred to as a market town, but since 1583, it has been again only a village. In 1569, Frankštát was sold and joined to the Šumperk estate.

In the mid-19th century, the village became industrialised. Several small factories were established, most notably a brickyard and a chamotte goods factory. At the beginning of the 20th century, 95% of the population were Germans.

After World War II, the German-speaking population was expelled. The municipality was renamed in 1947. Nový Malín was resettled by Czech families, including 120 Volhynian Czechs from the area of Český Malín.

== Demographics ==
Historical population

Year	Pop.	±%
1869	2,593	—
1880	2,838	+9.4%
1890	3,057	+7.7%
1900	3,204	+4.8%
1910	3,353	+4.7%

Year	Pop.	±%
1921	3,060	−8.7%
1930	3,138	+2.5%
1950	1,954	−37.7%
1961	2,219	+13.6%
1970	2,063	−7.0%

Year	Pop.	±%
1980	2,209	+7.1%
1991	2,143	−3.0%
2001	2,523	+17.7%
2011	3,129	+24.0%
2021	3,467	+10.8%

Source: Censuses

== Transport ==
Nový Malín is located on the railway line Šumperk–Vyškov via Olomouc.

== Sights ==
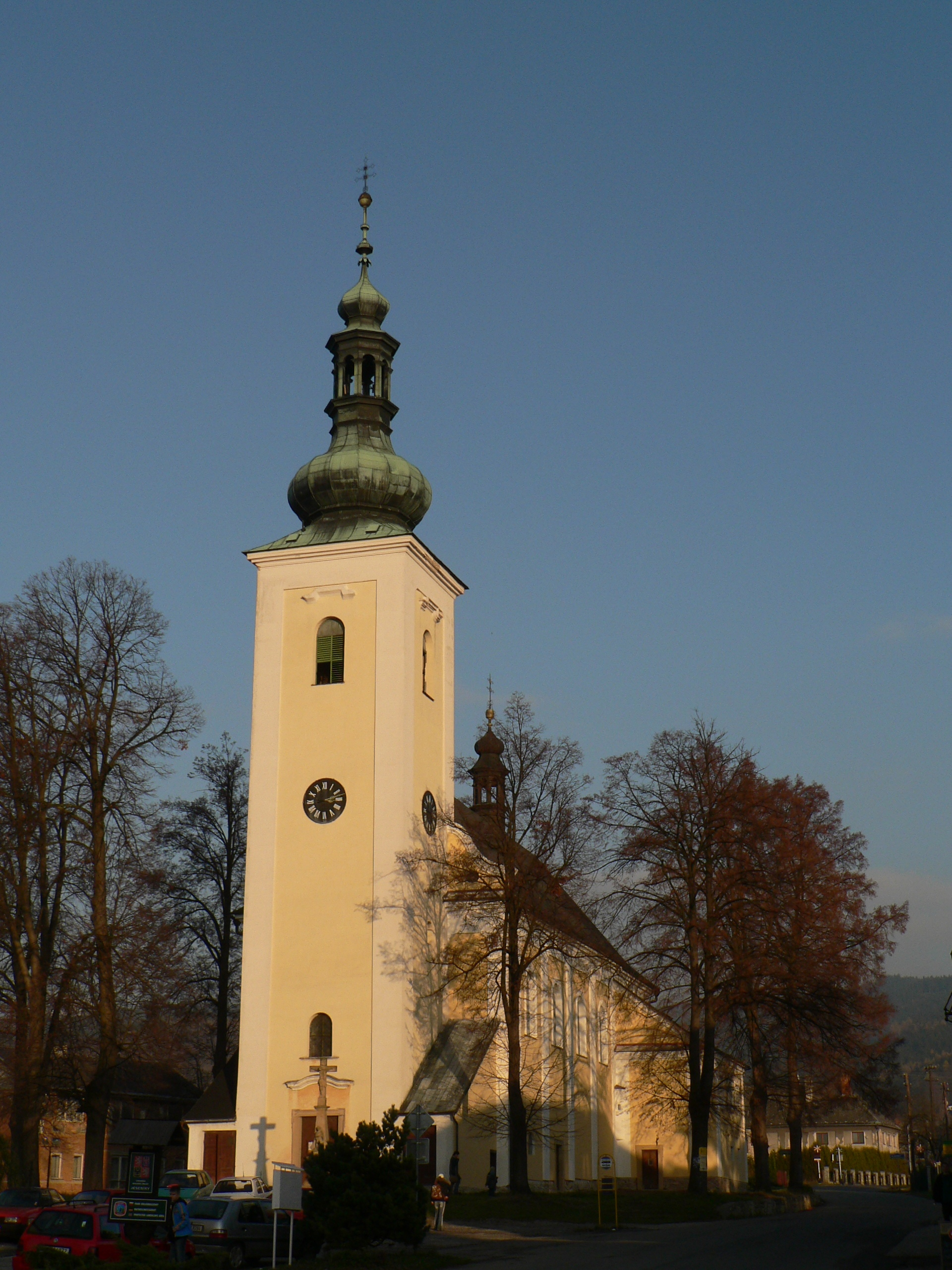
Church of the Nativity of the Virgin Mary

The main landmark of Nový Malín is the Church of the Nativity of the Virgin Mary. It was originally a medieval church, completely rebuilt in the Baroque style and extended in 1724. The remains of the original church were two bells from the 15th century. The bell from 1412 was stolen during World War II. The bell from 1468 is still in the church and is among the oldest bells in the country.

The Church of Saint Nicholas is located in Mladoňov. It is also a valuable Baroque building.

== Notable people ==
- Anton Emil Titl (1809–1882), Austrian composer and conductor; studied here in 1821–1824
