= Jackiewicz =

Jackiewicz is a Polish surname. Notable people with the surname include:

- Dariusz Jackiewicz (born 1973), Polish footballer
- Dawid Jackiewicz (born 1973), Polish politician
- Rafał Jackiewicz (born 1977), Polish professional boxer

== See also ==
- Jankiewicz
