= Jan Bohuszewicz =

Polish painter

- Born: 7 February 1878; Osowiec, Płock Governorate, Congress Poland, Russian Empire
- Died: 13 February 1935; Santa Margherita Ligure, Italy
- Education: Privately with Józef Rapacki in Warsaw
- Known for: Painting
- Movement: Impressionism

Jan Bohuszewicz (7 February 1878 – 13 February 1935) was a Polish painter.

Jan Bohuszewicz was born in Osowiec, close to Mława. He studied painting with Józef Rapacki in Warsaw. He took an active part in the Revolution of 1905, following which he moved to Zakopane, to flee repression. Due to health problems, he settled in Genoa, from which he went on numerous artist travels inter alia to Venice, Liguria, Chioggia, and Piedmont.

In 1920, he visited Poland during an independent exhibition at the Society of the Incentive for Fine Arts (Towarzystwo Zachęty Sztuk Pięknych). Two years later, his artwork was exhibited at the Association France-Pologne, were about fifty of his artworks were put up on display as part of the exhibition. He died in 1935 in Santa Margherita Ligure.

== Selected paintings ==
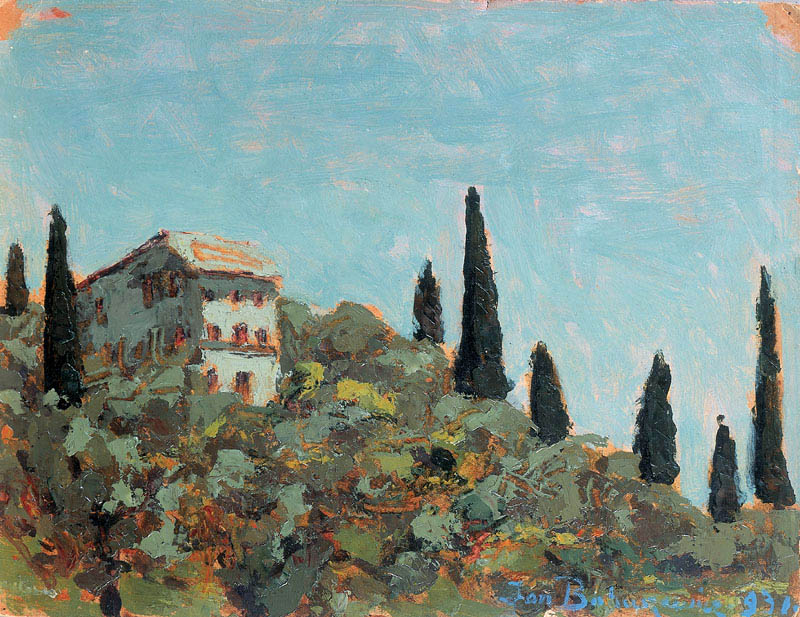
Cypresses on a hill
(1931)

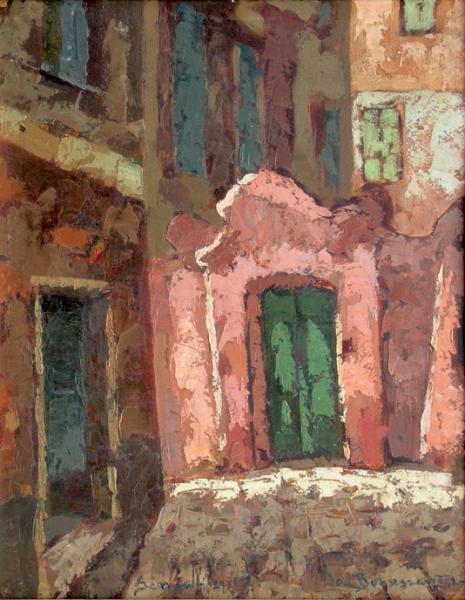
Gate in the sunshine
(1927)

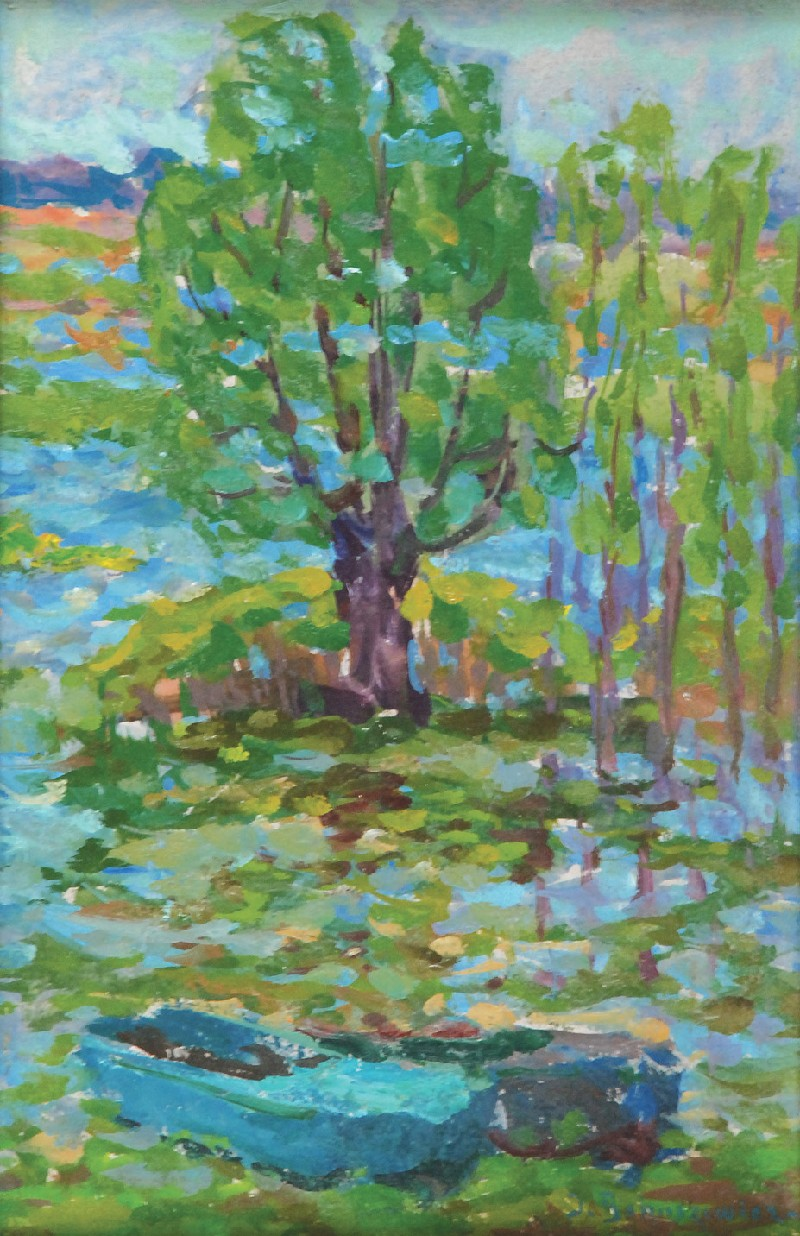
Waterside

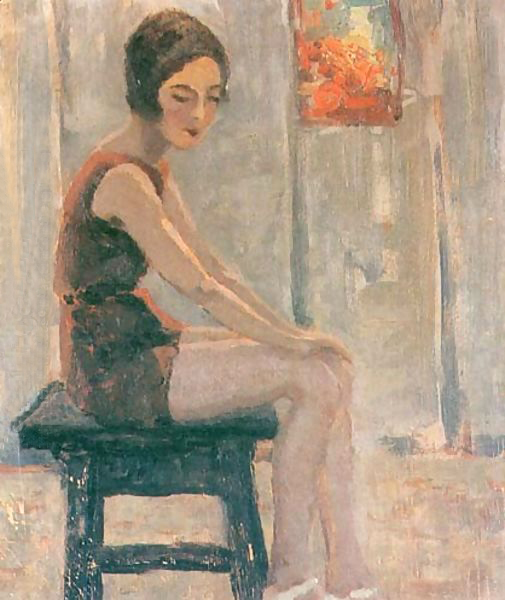
Sylvia's Red Suit
