= Chlebowski =

Chlebowski (feminine: Chlebowska; plural: Chlebowscy) is a Polish surname. Notable people with this surname include:

- Jakub Chlebowski (1905–1969), Polish physician
- Stanisław Chlebowski (1835–1884), Polish painter
- Zbigniew Chlebowski (born 1964), Polish politician
