= Waszkiewicz =

Waszkiewicz is a Polish surname. Notable people with it include:

- Adam Waszkiewicz (born 1993), Polish football player
- Aleksander Waszkiewicz (1901–1945), Soviet military officer of Polish descent
- Daniel Waszkiewicz (born 1957), Polish handball player
- Eugeniusz Waszkiewicz (1890–1972), Polish sports shooter, competitor in the 1924 Summer Olympics
- Jan Waszkiewicz (1944–2021), Polish politician, regional official, and academic
- Olga Vashkevich (born 1988), Belarusian basketball player
