= Mlyniv =

Rural locality in Rivne Oblast, Ukraine

Mlyniv Млинів
- Rural settlement
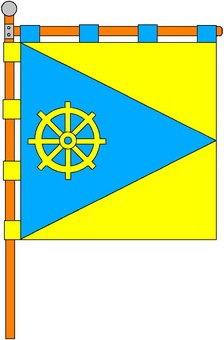
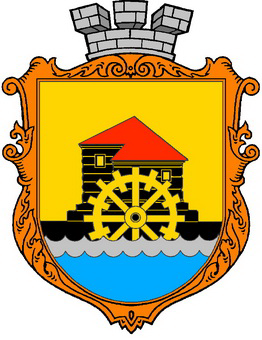
- Flag Coat of arms

- Location of Mlyniv in Ukraine Mlyniv (Ukraine)
- Coordinates: 50°30′50″N 25°36′24″E
- Country: Ukraine
- Oblast: Rivne Oblast
- Raion: Dubno Raion
- Hromada: Mlyniv settlement hromada
- First mentioned: 1445
- Town status: 1959

Government
  - Town Head: Serhiy Vorobei

Area
  - Total: 20.52 km^{2} (7.92 sq mi)
- Elevation: 191 m (627 ft)

Population (2001)
  - Total: 8,446
  - Density: 411.6/km^{2} (1,066/sq mi)
- Time zone: UTC+2 (EET)
  - Summer (DST): UTC+3 (EEST)
- Postal code: 35100
- Area code: +380 3659
- Website: http://rada.gov.ua/

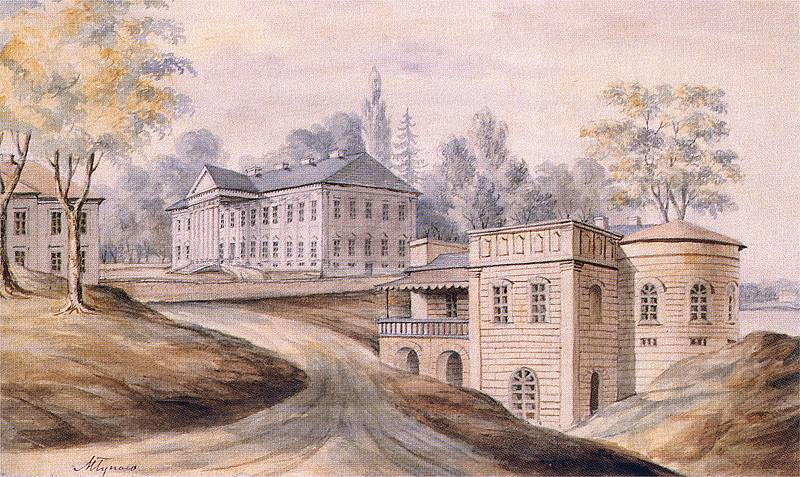
Chodkiewicz Palace in Mlyniv by Napoleon Orda (around 1870)

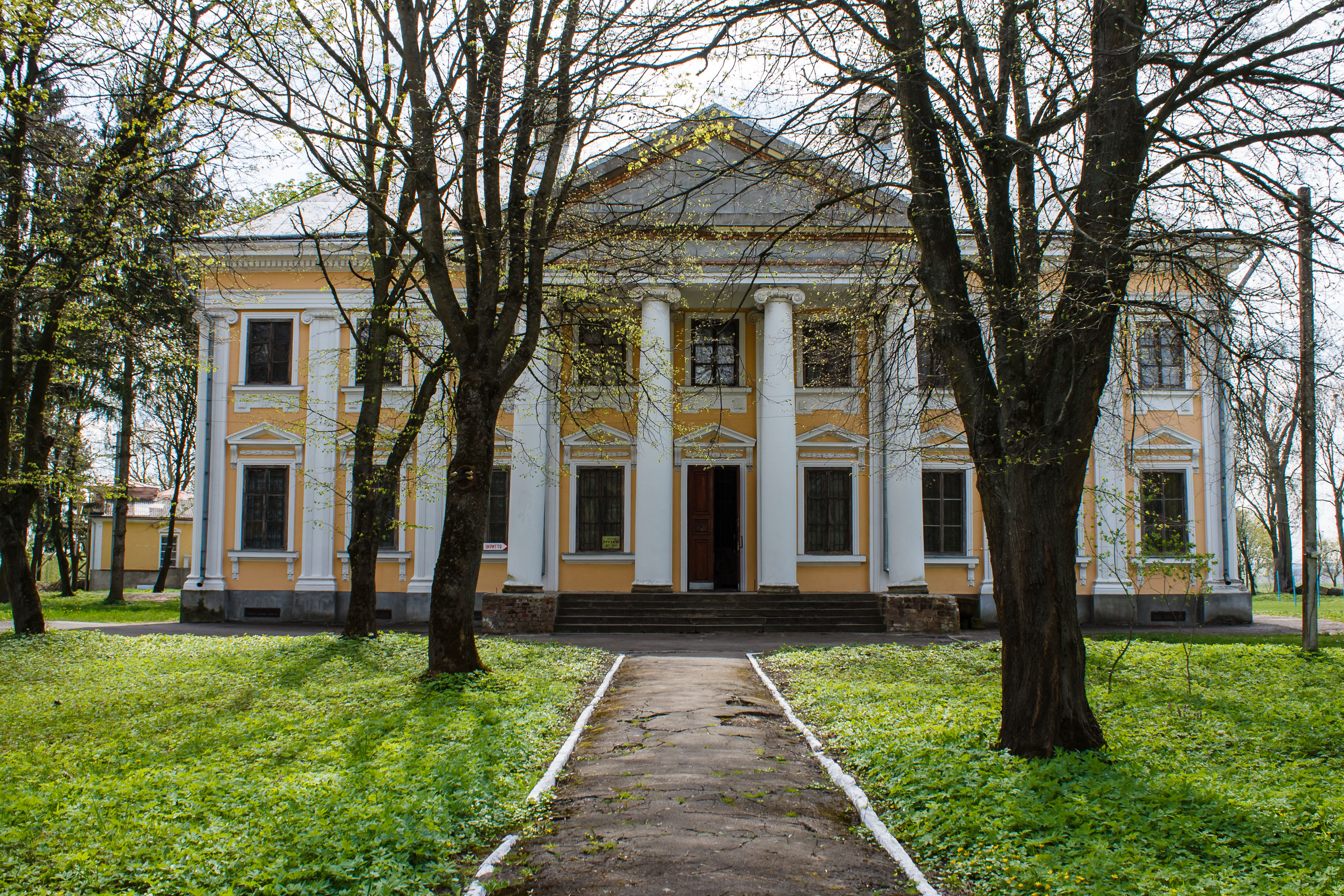
Smaller palace (remnants of Chodkiewicz Palace complex), Korecki mansion

Mlyniv (Ukrainian: Млинів; Polish: Młynów) is a rural settlement in Rivne Oblast (province) in western Ukraine. Mlyniv was also formerly the administrative center of Mlyniv Raion, housing the district's local administration buildings, although it is now administrated under Dubno Raion. Its population was 8,446 as of the 2001 Ukrainian census. The current population is 8,036 (2022 estimate).

The settlement is located on the banks of the Ikva River, a tributary of the Styr. It acquired the status of an urban-type settlement in 1959 in Soviet Ukraine.

== History ==
The settlement has a long history. Archaeological excavations confirm that its territory was populated at least since the first millennium BCE. At its northern outskirts on the right bank of the river Ikva, traces of a flint tool shop and remnants of the old Ruthenian settlement of Muravytsia, mentioned in chronicles from 1149, were discovered.

Mlyniv itself was first mentioned when Grand Duke Alexander Jagiellon gave it away to someone by the name of Bobr sometime in beginning of 16th century. In 1508 it became a private property of the governor of Kremenets, Montaut. Because the settlement's ownership changed often, it suffered greatly due to an increase in exploitation and the implementation of higher taxes and dues. In 1566 the Volhynian Voivodeship, Grand Duchy of Lithuania was formed, and the settlement became a part of it. In 1568 Prince Holovnia-Ostrzozecki attacked and robbed the village. After the 1569 Union of Lublin, the Volhynian Voivodeship became part of the Crown of Poland. By the 17th century population of the settlement was no higher than 300 people.

During the Khmelnytskyi Uprising, the settlement supported the rebelling Cossacks. In spring of 1648 the insurgents destroyed the neighboring mansion of Muravytsia. The struggle against the Crown of Poland did not stop with signing of the Muscovite–Polish treaty of Andrusovo. At the time of The Ruin, Ukrainian poet and important public figure Danylo Bratkovsky lived in Mlyniv; he supported the armed uprising of Semen Paliy (see Paliy uprising) and sought unification of all of Ukraine on both banks of the Dnieper River. Bratkovsky wrote an official statement to the people with a call to stand against the efforts of Jesuits and Uniates (Ruthenian Uniate Church).

After extinguishing the peasant revolts, the new owner of the settlement, Prince Chodkiewicz, built a new palace and kościół (Roman Catholic church).

It was granted Magdeburg rights by the Polish king in 1789, before the Second Partition of Poland. In 1792 the settlement was visited by Polish national hero Tadeusz Kościuszko. Following the partition of Poland, in 1795 Mlyniv was included at first to the Volhynian Viceroyalty and in two years to Dubno County of the Podolia Governorate. After 1804 it was made part of the Volhynian Governorate, Russian Empire.

=== Russian period ===
A small but growing Jewish community was present in Mlyniv in the early 1800s when the area became part of Russia in the Second Partition of Poland. In the 1850 revision list (census), there were a total of 27 Jewish households, 48 different family names, and 202 total Jews in the town. Most of them had been in the town at least as early as 1834. In the 1858 revision list, the Jewish population had grown to 280 Jews. A history of the Mlyniv Jewish community is now available.

In 1840s Mlyniv was visited by Polish writer-ethnographer Józef Ignacy Kraszewski who described Mlyniv (Młynów) and mentioned Chodkiewicz Palace in his work "Recollections from Volhynia, Polesie, and Lithuania".

After the 1861 Russian agrarian reform, the local peasants had to pay chynsh (quit-rent), eight poods of grain from one morgue (.56 hectares (1.4 acres)). As of the 1860s the town had a sawmill, a small wine distillery, a simple iron-casing shop which accounted for some 60 workers in 1903–1904. Fishing in local rivers was prohibited for the local population. There were a couple of big fires in 1858 and 1905 which destroyed some 60 buildings.

During the 1905 Revolution, the iron casting shop fell under the influence of the Konotop branch of the Russian Social Democratic Labour Party. According to a memoir by Clara Fram, the iron casting shop was owned by her great-grandfather, Moshe Gruber, one of the Jewish families in town. In summer of 1906, strikes and demonstrations in Mlyniv involved some 200 workers and caused local authorities to request help from Dubno County authorities. The revolutionary activities ceased by December 1906, after which Dubno dispatched a police cavalry detachment. In Mlyniv there was a small two-grade parish school, which in 1911 graduated nine boys and three girls.

During World War I the front moved back and forth close to Mlyniv. Many buildings in the settlement were destroyed. In 1915 Mlyniv was located right at the Austrian-Russian frontline (Eastern Front). The Chodkiewicz Palace and park were in the hands of Austrian troops, while the settlement was held by Russians.

Soon after the Bolshevik coup-d'état (also known as the October Revolution), a volost committee was created in Mlyniv, headed by Zabolotsky. The committee nationalized Chodkiewicz Palace. In February 1918, Mlyniv was liberated from the Soviet authorities with help of Austro-German troops and became part of the Ukrainian People's Republic. In June 1919 the First Ukrainian Soviet Division destroyed Ukrainian troops and reinstated the Soviet regime in Mlyniv. After that Mlyniv was governed by the local kombed.

=== Polish period ===
During the Polish–Soviet War, Mlyniv changed hands between various armies. In July 1920, for a short period of time the Soviet regime once again was secured on the efforts of the 14th Soviet Cavalry Division (commander Oleksandr Parkhomenko, part of the First Cavalry Army, Konnarmia). According to the 1921 Treaty of Riga, Mlyniv became part of the Second Polish Republic (Wołyń Voivodeship).

In 1921 the town had a population of 1263. As part of Poland, the Polish language became enforced (revived) as the official language. In 1932 a state school with seven grades was built. A local pharmacy was also opened. In 1930 the population of Mlyniv declined in comparison with 1921. In February 1926 a local chapter of the Communist Party of Western Ukraine was founded, and in 1935, its youth wing Komsomol. To fight the increase in communist influence, a local starosta requested an increase in the number of local police officers. In September 1934, demonstrations organized by the local communists resulted in the arrest of 23 people. Another communist action took place in February 1938 to demand the release of Belarusian revolutionary Sergey Pritytsky. The action requested help for Republican Spain (Spanish Civil War), as well as to fight fascism and for the democratization of Poland and liberation of West Ukraine. A Catholic parish existed in Mlyniv within Dubno County.

=== World War II ===
Soon after the start of World War II and the next partition of Poland by Nazi Germany and the Soviet Union, the village, as part of West Ukraine, was again occupied (liberated) by the Red Army. The 8th Mechanized Corps (with commander Dmitry Ryabyshev) was stationed near Mlyniv for two years. A number of prominent Polish families were sent to Siberia by the NKVD in 1940. In October 1939 elections to the National Assembly of Western Ukraine took place in Mlyniv. Following the admission of Western Ukraine to the Soviet Union and unification with the Ukrainian SSR, Mlyniv became an administrative center of Mlyniv Raion. A local club, library, maternity hospital, and small clinic were opened.

Mlyniv was overrun by the German army in Operation Barbarossa on 24 June 1941. The local school was transformed into the commandant's and Gestapo headquarters. During the Nazi Germany occupation, 1118 people were killed. Ukrainian nationalists participated in repressions against the local Soviet population. In June 1943, the local population provided some assistance to the Sydir Kovpak partisans.

Between 1942 and 1945 it was one of many sites where massacres of Poles and Jews took place, committed by the death squads of the Ukrainian Insurgent Army and the local Ukrainian peasants.

Notably, the Ukrainian sotnia led by Hryrory Levko ("Kruk") operated in the area until 1947, long after the Soviet counter-offensive of 1944. The Polish self-defence in Młynów managed to hold back the repeated raids by the Ukrainian nationalists as one of only several such outposts, which also included the civilian defence of Kurdybań Warkowicki, Lubomirka, Klewań, Rokitno, Budki Snowidowickie, and Osty. Their survival could be at least partly explained by the Nazi German presence there before the Soviet takeover.

During the 1944–1946 Polish population transfers, the remaining Polish inhabitants of Mlyniv were expelled.

Personal first-hand accounts by survivors from the period between 1939 and 1944 are now translated from the Yiddish and Hebrew in a new annotated translation of the Mlynov-Muravica Memorial (Yizkor) book.

=== Post war ===
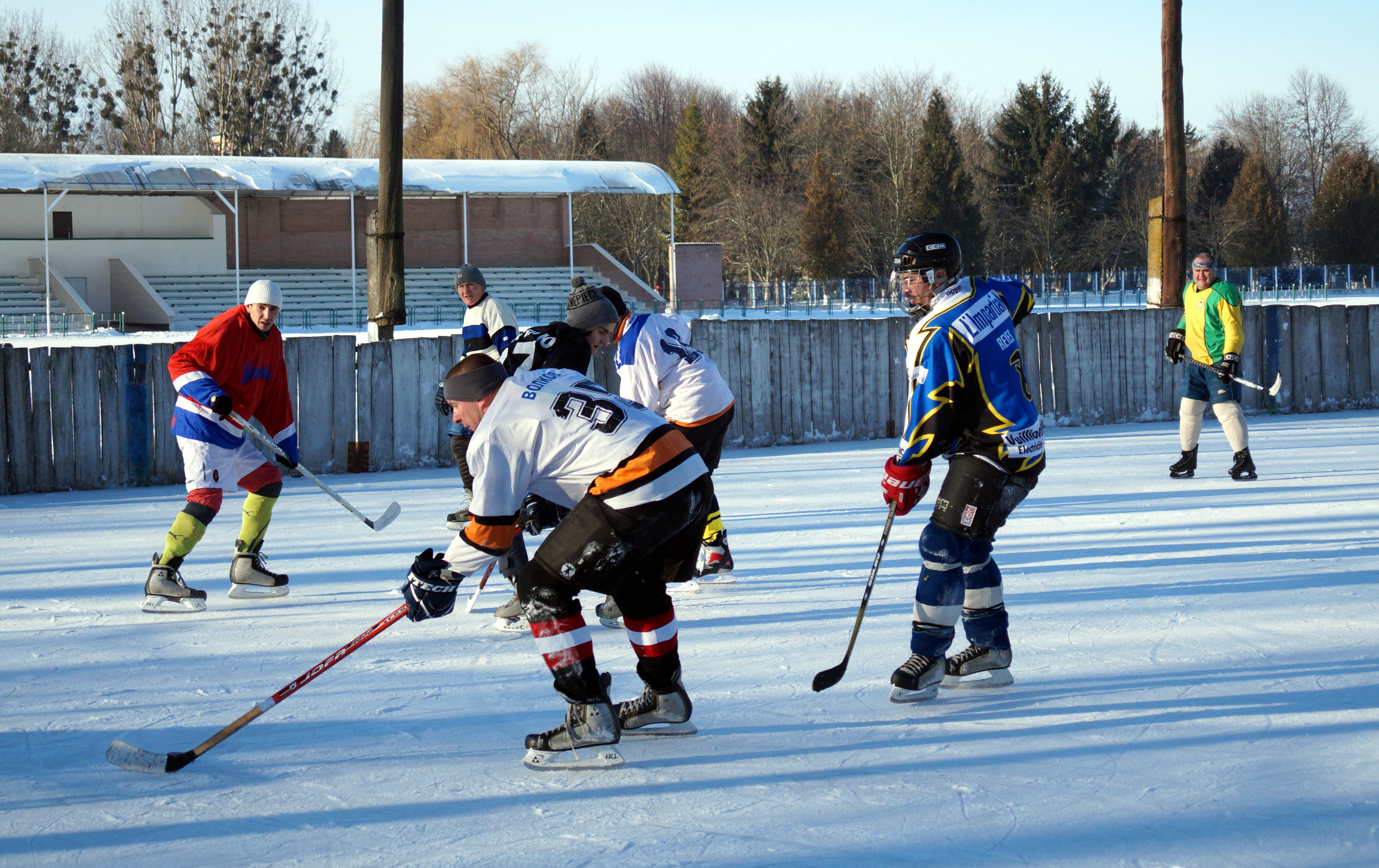
Hockey rink at the local Kolos Stadium

Mlyniv was liberated from the occupation of Nazi Germany by the Soviet 13th Guard Cavalry Division under commander Pyotr Zubov. Following the war, the population of Mlyniv consisted of 462 people.

Since May 1953 the Mlyniv Hydro-Electric Station has been in operation with single turbine made by Austrian company Voith. Construction of the hydro-electric station started during the Second Polish Republic. During that time, a dam was built. Due to the war, further construction was suspended.

Until 26 January 2024, Mlyniv was designated urban-type settlement. On this day, a new law entered into force which abolished this status, and Mlyniv became a rural settlement.

== Notable people ==
- Yitzhak Lamdan (1899–1954), Hebrew-language poet and translator
