= Kurdybań Warkowicki =

Former village in Rivne Oblast, Ukraine

Coordinates: 50°29′N 25°55′E

- Village (no longer existing)
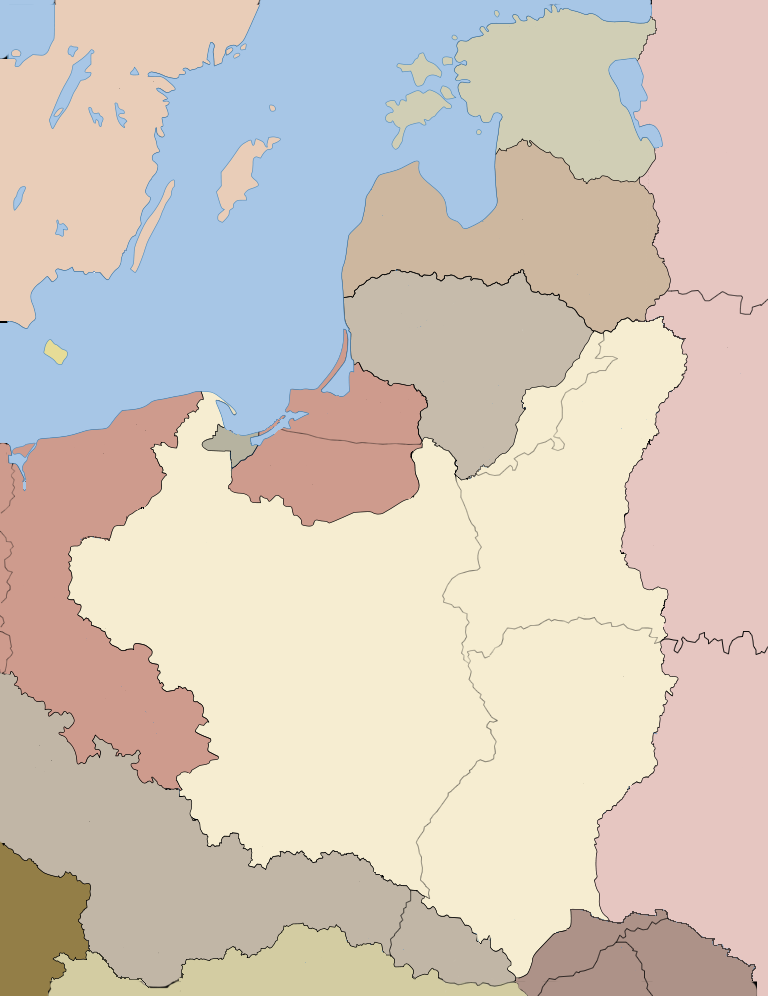
- Location of the Kurdybań Warkowicki on the map of interwar Poland
- Country: (Poland) Second Polish Republic
- Voivodeship: Wołyń Voivodeship
- County: Sarny

Kurdybań Warkowicki, or Kurdyban–Warkowicki, was a Polish village in Wołyń Voivodeship (1921–1939) before the joint Nazi German and Soviet invasions of Poland in 1939. It was located near the town of Warkowicze (Ukrainian: Варковичi) in Dubno County, in the eastern part of the Second Polish Republic (now, in Ukraine). The village was eradicated during the Polish population transfers after World War II, when the Kresy macroregion was formally incorporated into the Soviet Union.

== World War II ==
The village was a site of an OUN-UPA ethnic cleansing operation against the Polish civilians, led by the Ukrainian Military Group No. 02 called the "Bohun" during the wave of massacres of Poles in Volhynia between 1942 and 1945. The Polish self-defence unit managed to hold its position there until the arrival of the Red Army in 1944. The witnesses consider such survival remarkable with no German outposts and no Polish partisans in its vicinity. Unlike neighbouring settlements, Kurdybań was not surrounded by the forest; therefore, the UPA units had no place to hide against its defenders equipped with a heavy machine gun disassembled from a Soviet tank destroyed by the Germans. The Kurdybań provided refuge for Jewish families escaping the Holocaust in its vicinity. The local self-defence was made up of around 60 men including 25 Polish Jews.

Most Polish self-defence units across the province fell — unable to defend the population against the genocide. Kurdybań Warkowicki was one of the only a handful of surviving units, among them: Młynów (now Mlyniv), Lubomirka, Klewań, Rokitno (in the Pinsk Marshes), Budki Snowidowickie and Osty. The settlement no longer exists. It was liquidated likely during the Polish population transfers (1944–46).

== See also ==
- History of Poland (1939–1945)
- Historiography of the Volyn tragedy
