= Alexander Lakier =

Russian historian

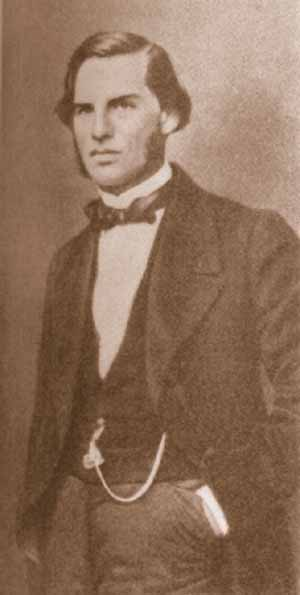
Alexander Lakier

Alexander Borisovich Lakier (Russian: Лакиер, Александр Борисович) (1825-1870) was a Russian historian of German descent who was interested in heraldry.

Alexander Lakier was born in the city of Taganrog in 1825. His father, Boris Lakier, a convert from Judaism, was the doctor who certified the death of the late Russian Emperor Alexander I of Russia who died in Taganrog in 1825.

Lakier graduated from the Legal Dept. of the Moscow University and defended his thesis with On Domains and Estates (O Votchinah i Pomestyakh) released in Saint Petersburg in 1848. In 1856-1858, Lakier traveled across Europe, Palestine and the United States of America. He kept a travel diary, fragments of which were published in Sovremennik (1858) and The Russian Messenger (1858) and were later included in the book The Travel Through North American States, Canada and Cuba, which was published in Saint Petersburg in 1859. In 1858, Alexander Lakier entered the Russian Ministry of Internal Affairs, where he was involved in statistics work and worked as editor in the commission on liberation of peasants. In 1860, he returned to Taganrog, where he worked as lawyer.

Alexander Lakier published The History of Russian Sovereigns' Titles (1847), On Service in Russia before Peter The Great Times (Saint Petersburg, 1850), Review of Relations between Russia and England in 16th and 17th Centuries (1854) and other. His most famous work was "Russian Heraldry" (Saint Petersburg, 1855). This oeuvre is still a valuable reference, where Lakier made an attempt to analyze and explain coats of arms of Russian dukes and nobility. The volume also featured the history of Russian stamps - unique until the early 20th century.
