= Kreis Lissa =

Coordinates: 51°50′36″N 16°34′16″E

Location of the Lissa district in the Province of Posen

Kreis Lissa (Polish: Powiat leszczyński) was a district in Regierungsbezirk Posen, in the Prussian province of Posen from 1887 to 1920. Its territory presently lies in the southern part of the Greater Poland Voivodeship in Poland.

== History ==
On October 1, 1887, the Lissa district was formed from the eastern part of the Fraustadt district. The city of Lissa was the district capital.

On December 27, 1918, the Greater Poland uprising began in the province of Posen, and by January 1919 the north-eastern part of the district around the town of Storchnest was under Polish control. The south-western part of the district, including Lissa and Reisen remained under German control.

On February 16, 1919, an armistice ended the Polish-German fighting, and on June 28, 1919, the German government officially ceded the Lissa district to newly founded Poland with the signing of the Treaty of Versailles. On November 25, 1919, Germany and Poland concluded an agreement on the evacuation and surrender of the areas to be ceded, which was ratified on January 10, 1920. The evacuation of the remaining area under German control including the district town of Lissa and the handover to Poland took place between January 17 and February 4, 1920.

== Demographics ==
The district had a German majority population, with a significant Polish minority. Most Germans lived in the district town of Lissa. According to the Prussian census of 1905, Kreis Lissa had a population of 42,467, of which 63% were Germans and 37% were Poles.

== Military command ==
Kreis Lissa was part of the military command (German: Bezirkskommando) in Posen at Glogau, Silesia.

== Court system ==
The main court (German: Landgericht) was in Ostrowo, with lower court (German: Amtsgericht) in Lissa.

== Civil registry offices ==
In 1905, these civil registry offices (German: Standesamt) served the following towns in Kreis Lissa:

- Garzyn
- Lissa
- Murkingen
- Reisen
- Schwetzkau
- Storchnest
- Zaborowo

== Police districts ==
In 1905, these police districts (German: Polizeidistrikt) served towns in Kreis Lissa:

- Lissa Ost (east)
- Lissa West
- Reisen
- Schwetzkau
- Storchnest

== Catholic churches ==
In 1905, these Catholic parish churches served towns in Kreis Lissa:

- Alt Laube
- Czerwonawies
- Deutsch Wilke
- Golembitz
- Gollmitz
- Kankel
- Lissa
- Murke
- Oporowo
- Pawlowitz
- Punitz
- Radomitz
- Reisen
- Retschke
- Schwetzkau
- Storchnest
- Swierczyn

== Protestant churches ==
In 1905, Protestant parish churches served towns in Kreis Lissa:

- Feuerstein
- Lissa
- Mohnsdorf
- Punitz
- Reisen
- Storchnest
- Ulbersdorf
- Wolfskirch
- Zaborowo
