= Osada =

Osada can refer to:

== People ==
- Hiroshi Osada (長田 弘; 1939–2015), Japanese poet and author
- Juri Osada (長田 樹里; born 1965), Japanese figure skater
- Kenichi Osada (岡田 健一; born 1975), Japanese engineer
- Koichiro Osada (長田 紘一郎; born 1999), Japanese politician
- Michiyasu Osada (長田 道泰; born 1978), Japanese former football player
- Osada Not (長田ノオト), Japanese manga artist and animator
- Shuichiro Osada (長田 秀一郎; born 1980), Japanese professional baseball player
- Stanisław Osada (1869–1934), a Polish nationalist and author
- Tomoki Osada (長田 智希; born 1999), Japanese rugby union player
- Yukiko Osada (長田 友喜子; born 1981), Japanese retired swimmer

== Places ==
- Osada, Masovian Voivodeship, a village in the administrative district of Gmina Gostynin in Poland

== Others ==
- Osada (software), see comparison of software and protocols for distributed social networking

== See also ==
- Osada Leśna (disambiguation)
