= Bernhard Naunyn =

German pathologist (1839–1925)

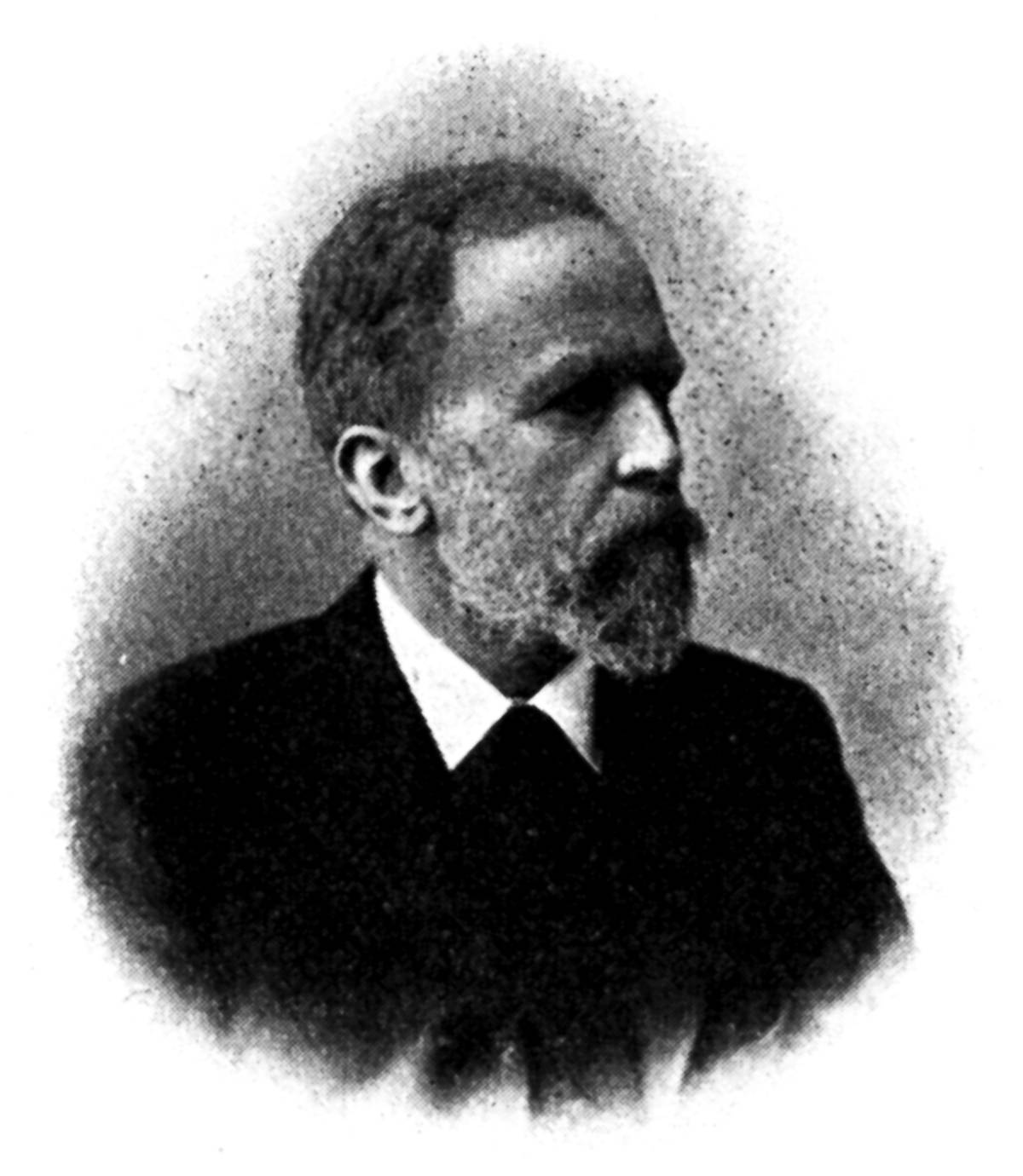
Bernhard Naunyn

Bernhard Naunyn (2 September 1839 – 26 July 1925) was a German pathologist, born in Berlin.

== Biography ==
After receiving his degree at the University of Berlin in 1863, he became an assistant to pathologist Friedrich Theodor von Frerichs (1819–1885) at the Charité. Afterwards he was the head of medical clinics in Dorpat (1869–1871), Bern (1871–1872), Königsberg (1872–1888), and Strasbourg, where he also taught at the Imperial University (1888–1904).

Naunyn is remembered for his work in experimental pathology, particularly metabolic pathology; also referred to as xenobiotic metabolism. It was during the time he spent working at Frerich's clinic in Berlin that he became interested in the metabolic pathology regarding the liver, pancreas and other internal organs. In his studies of the fermentation processes of the stomach, he noticed the "contra-fermentation" properties of benzene. He discovered that the human organism excreted phenol after it had received benzene. With physician Otto Schultzen (1837–1875) he discovered that benzene-derived hydrocarbons in the body had the ability to perform chemistry that was not possible for chemists to achieve in a conventional laboratory.

With pharmacologist Oswald Schmiedeberg (1838–1921) and pathologist Edwin Klebs (1834–1913) he founded Archiv für experimentelle Pathologie und Pharmakologie (now published as Naunyn-Schmiedeberg's Archives of Pharmacology), and in 1896 with surgeon Jan Mikulicz-Radecki (1850–1905) he founded Mitteilungen aus dem Grenzgebieten der Medizin und Chirurgie. A famous student of Naunyn's was Otto Loewi (1873–1961), who was the winner of the Nobel Prize in Physiology or Medicine in 1936.

His grave is preserved in the Protestant Friedhof II der Jerusalems- und Neuen Kirchengemeinde (Cemetery No. II of the congregations of Jerusalem's Church and New Church) in Berlin-Kreuzberg, south of Hallesches Tor.

== Cholelithiasis and diabetes research ==
Naunyn made contributions in his research of cholelithiasis and diabetes. He published an important treatise on diabetes titled Der Diabetes mellitus (1898), and his Klinik der Cholelithiasis was translated into English by Archibald Garrod (1857–1936) as "A treatise on cholelithiasis" (1896). With Oskar Minkowski (1858–1931), he theorized that bile pigment formation was a function of liver cells alone, however this theory was later disproved by John William McNee in 1913.

Naunyn proposed a strict low-carbohydrate diet for diabetic patients. He was one of the few German researchers influenced by the Cantani system who locked patients in their rooms for months at a time when necessary for them to abstain from sugar. Frederick Madison Allen described Naunyn as a "champion of strict carbohydrate-free diet in a German medical congress where most of the speakers opposed it".

In 1889, it was noted that "Naynyn, who, in accordance with the principles of Cantani, demands the strictest meat-diet." However, Naunyn later relaxed his dietary treatment based on the tolerance of caloric and carbohydrate requirements for each patient. In 1906, Naunyn was the first to use the term "acidosis", by which he meant the accumulation of ketone bodies.
