= Andrzej Krzycki =

Polish writer and archbishop

His Excellency Andrzej Krzycki
- Archbishop of Gniezno; Primate of Poland
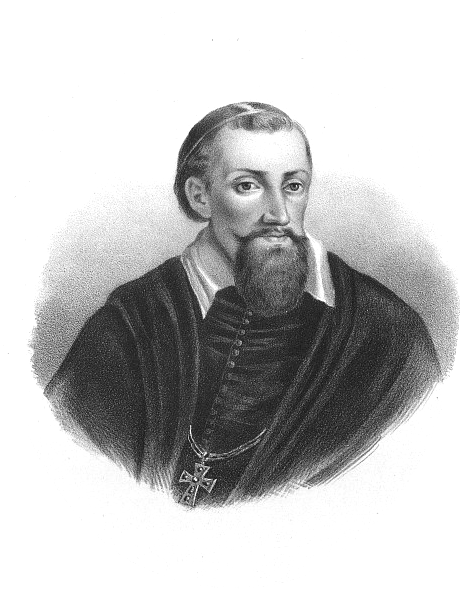
- Church: Roman Catholic
- Archdiocese: Gniezno
- Installed: 1535
- Term ended: 1537

Orders
- Consecration: 1523

Personal details
- Born: 7 July 1482 Krzycko Małe
- Died: 10 May 1537 (aged 54) Skierniewice
- Coat of arms: Andrzej Krzycki's coat of arms

Andrzej Krzycki of the Kotwicz coat of arms (also known as Andreas Cricius in Latin; 7 July 1482 – 10 May 1537) was a Renaissance Polish writer and archbishop. Krzycki wrote in prose in Latin and poetry in Polish. He is often considered one of Poland's greatest humanist writers.

== Biography ==
Krzycki was born on 7 July 1482 in the village of Krzycko Małe to Mikołaj Tomicki and Anna Tomicka, the latter being the sister of Bishop Piotr Tomicki. He studied rhetoric, clerical, and civil law at the University of Bologna under prominent humanists, and started a career in church hierarchy in 1501. In 1512, Barbara Zapolya married King Sigismund I the Old. Krzycki wrote a verse to commemorate this marriage, and became Zapolya's secretary the same year. When the king won the victory at the Battle of Orsha, Krzycki once again wrote a poem, and sent verses purporting to be from the queen to her absent husband after the model of Ovid's Epistolae Heroidum; these, in a letter to Krzycki, Erasmus praised enthusiastically. After Barbara's death, he continued to be chancellor in the household of Bona Sforza, Sigismund's second wife. He took orders and managed to obtain rich benefits, and even a bishopric.

The Reformation, then rapidly spreading, filled him with dismay, and was the occasion of the most serious work that he produced, Religionis et Reipublicae quaerimonia (1522). When Albert of Brandenburg, Grand Master of the Teutonic Knights, became a Lutheran, and Sigismund I recognized him as his vassal and Duke of East Prussia, Krzycki in a letter written to Baron Pulleon, tried to explain and justify this action of his sovereign. He finally rose to the highest clerical office in his country, that of Primate Archbishop of Gniezno. He was a patron of youthful talent, as in the case of Klemens Janicki. His last work, De Asiana Dieta, was a criticism of the Polish diets or assemblies common in his time.

Krzycki died on 10 May 1537 in Skierniewice.

== See also ==
- List of Poles

Preceded by Rafał Leszczyński	Bishop of Płock; 1527–1535	Succeeded by Jan Chojeński
