= Oswald Schmiedeberg =

Baltic German pharmacologist (1838–1921)

Johann Ernst Oswald Schmiedeberg
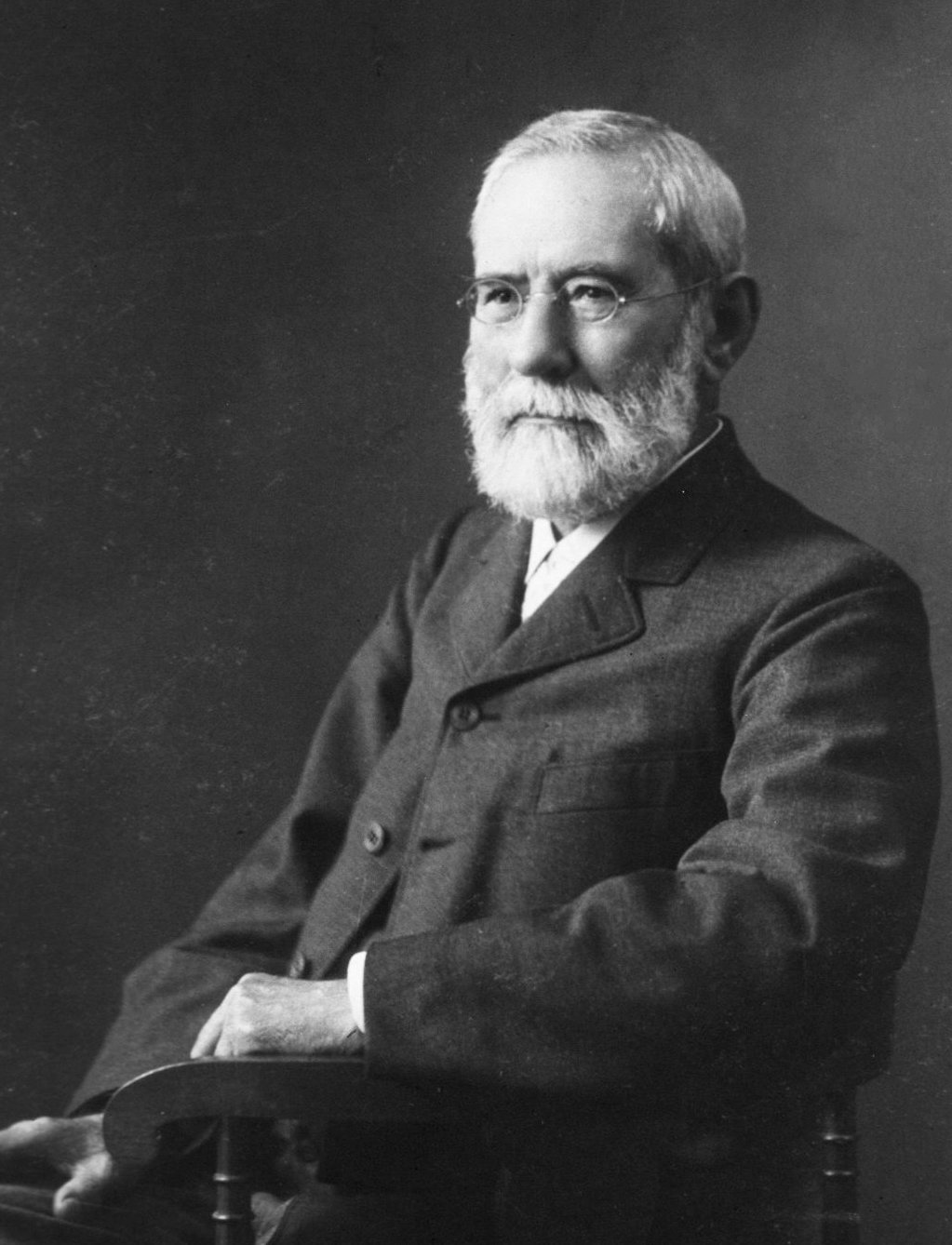
- Born: 10 October 1838; Courland, Courland Governorate, Russian Empire
- Died: 12 July 1921 (aged 82); Baden-Baden
- Education: Imperial University of Dorpat

Johann Ernst Oswald Schmiedeberg (10 October 1838 – 12 July 1921) was a Baltic German pharmacologist. In 1866 he earned his medical doctorate from the Imperial University of Dorpat with a thesis concerning the measurement of chloroform in blood, before becoming the first professor of pharmacology at the University of Strasbourg, where he remained for 46 years.

In 1911, he testified in the United States v. Forty Barrels and Twenty Kegs of Coca-Cola trial, and later, was a major factor in the success of the German pharmaceutical industry prior to the Second World War, having trained most of the European professors at the time.

== Early life and family ==
Oswald Schmiedeberg was born in Courland, one of the Baltic provinces of Russia. His father Wilhelm Ludwig (1809–1878) was a bailiff in Leidzen and later forester in Paggar (Estonia). His mother Anna Lucie Bernard (1813–1871) was the daughter of a watchmaker from Lausanne. Oswald was the eldest of six siblings of whom a brother Johann Julius Rudolf became a forester. After education at the primary school at Permisküla, and the gymnasium in Dorpat he entered the medical school at the University of Dorpat.

== Career ==
In 1866 he earned his medical doctorate from the Imperial University of Dorpat with a thesis concerning the measurement of chloroform in blood, titled "Determination and Concentration of Chloroform in the Blood", and remained an assistant to Rudolf Buchheim at Dorpat (Tartu) until 1869. He was appointed Chair of Pharmacology and for one year then worked with Carl Ludwig at the University of Leipzig.

In 1872 he became the first professor of pharmacology at the University of Strasbourg, where he remained for the next 46 years.

His work largely dealt with chemicals poisonous to the heart, causing vomiting and those causing passing urine, as well as hypnotics, venoms and metals. With his pupil Hans Horst Meyer he discovered glucuronic acid as a conjugation partner in xenobiotic metabolism and later found that glucuronic acid was also a component of cartilage and occurred as a disaccharide of chondroitin sulfate. He studied the composition of hyaluronic acid and explored its relationship to collagen, amyloid and chondroitin sulfate. In 1869 he demonstrated that muscarine had a similar effect on the heart as electrical stimulation of the vagus nerve. He also demonstrated the hypnotic properties of urethane.

In 1911, he testified in the United States v. Forty Barrels and Twenty Kegs of Coca-Cola trial.

Schmiedeberg was a major factor in the success of the German pharmaceutical industry prior to World War II, having trained most of the professors at the time. He published over 200 scientific books and articles and with pathologists Bernhard Naunyn (1839–1925) and Edwin Klebs (1834–1913), he co-founded the journal Naunyn-Schmiedeberg's Archives of Pharmacology.

== Death and legacy ==
Having been in declining health for the remainder of his life, Schmiedeberg died at the age of 82 of natural causes in Baden-Baden.

== Selected publications ==
- Ueber die quantitative bestimmung des Chloroforms im Blute und sein Verhalten gegen dasselbe. 1866 – On the quantitative determination of chloroform in the blood, etc.
- Das Muscarin. Das giftige Alkaloid des Fliegenpilzes (Agaricus muscarius L.) seine Darstellung, chemischen Eigenschaften, physiologischen Wirkungen, toxicologische Bedeutung und sein Verhältniss zur Pilzvergiftung im allgemeine, 1869 – Muscarine. The poisonous alkaloid of fly agaric mushroom, its representation, chemical properties, physiological effects, etc.
- Grundriss der Arzneimittellehre, 1883 – Fundamentals of pharmacology.
- "The dietetic and therapeutic uses of ferratin"; published in English (1893).
- "Ferratin : the ferruginous element of food"; published in English (1894).
- Grundriss der Pharmakologie in Bezug auf Arzneimittellehre und Toxikologie, 1902 Digital 5th edition from 1906 by the University and State Library Düsseldorf
- Arzneimittel und genussmittel, Salzwasser (1912). Digital edition by the University and State Library Düsseldorf
- Über die Pharmaka in der Ilias und Odyssee. Karl J. Trubner, Strasburg (1918). Digital edition by the University and State Library Düsseldorf
