= Gmina Święciechowa =

Gmina Święciechowa Święciechowa Commune
- Gmina
- Interactive map of Gmina Święciechowa
- Coordinates (Święciechowa): 51°51′N 16°30′E
- Country: Poland
- Voivodeship: Greater Poland
- County: Leszno County
- Seat: Święciechowa

Area
  - Total: 134.97 km^{2} (52.11 sq mi)

Population (2006)
  - Total: 7,088
  - Density: 52.52/km^{2} (136.0/sq mi)
- Website: https://www.swieciechowa.pl

Gmina Święciechowa is a rural gmina (administrative district) in Leszno County, Greater Poland Voivodeship, in west-central Poland. Its seat is the village of Święciechowa, which lies approximately 5 kilometres (3 mi) west of Leszno and 68 km (42 mi) south-west of the regional capital Poznań.

The gmina covers an area of 134.97 square kilometres (52.1 sq mi), and as of 2006 its total population is 7,088.

== Villages ==
Gmina Święciechowa contains the villages and settlements of Długie Nowe, Długie Stare, Henrykowo, Krzycko Małe, Książęcy Las, Lasocice, Niechłód, Ogrody, Osada Leśna, Piotrowice, Przybyszewo, Strzyżewice, Święciechowa and Trzebiny.

== Neighbouring gminas ==
Gmina Święciechowa is bordered by the city of Leszno and by the gminas of Góra, Lipno, Rydzyna, Włoszakowice and Wschowa.
