= Naunyn-Schmiedeberg's Archives of Pharmacology =

- Language: English
- Edited by: Roland Seifert

Publication details
- Former names: Naunyn-Schmiedebergs Archiv für Pharmakologie, Naunyn-Schmiedebergs Archiv für Pharmakologie und experimentelle Pathologie
- History: 1873–present
- Publisher: Springer
- Frequency: Monthly
- Impact factor: 2.238 (2017)

Standard abbreviations
- ISO 4: Naunyn-Schmiedeberg's Arch. Pharmacol.

Indexing
- CODEN: NSAPCC
- ISSN: 0028-1298 (print); 1432-1912 (web)
- OCLC no.: 01771667

Links
- Journal homepage

Naunyn-Schmiedeberg's Archives of Pharmacology (formerly Naunyn-Schmiedebergs Archiv für Pharmakologie and Naunyn-Schmiedebergs Archiv für Pharmakologie und experimentelle Pathologie) is a peer-reviewed scientific journal of pharmacology. The journal was established in 1873 by Bernhard Naunyn, Oswald Schmiedeberg, and Edwin Klebs. It is the official journal of the German Society of Experimental and Clinical Pharmacology and Toxicology (DGPT), and of the Sphingolipid Club.

The journal is published by Springer on a monthly basis and is currently edited by Roland Seifert.

== Abstracting and indexing ==
The journal is indexed and abstracted in the following bibliographics databases:

- BIOSIS
- Biological Abstracts
- CAB Abstracts
- CNKI
- ChemWeb
- Chemical Abstracts Service
- Chimica
- Current Abstracts
- Current Chemical Reactions
- Current Contents/Life Sciences
- EBSCO Biomedical Reference Collection
- EBSCO Discovery Service
- EBSCO Pharmacy Collection: India
- EBSCO TOC Premier
- EMBASE
- Elsevier Biobase
- Gale Academic OneFile
- Global Health
- Health Reference Center Academic
- Index Chemicus
- Index to Scientific & Technical Proceedings
- Journal Citation Reports/Science Edition
- Medline
- Pathway Studio
- ProQuest Central
- ProQuest Health & Medical Collection
- ProQuest Health Research Premium Collection
- ProQuest Medical Database
- ProQuest Pharma Collection
- Reaction Citation Index
- Reaxys
- SCOPUS
- Science Citation Index Expanded
- Science Citation Index
- Summon by ProQuest

According to the Journal Citation Reports, the journal has a 2017 impact factor of 2.238.
