= Rudolf Buchheim =

German pharmacologist

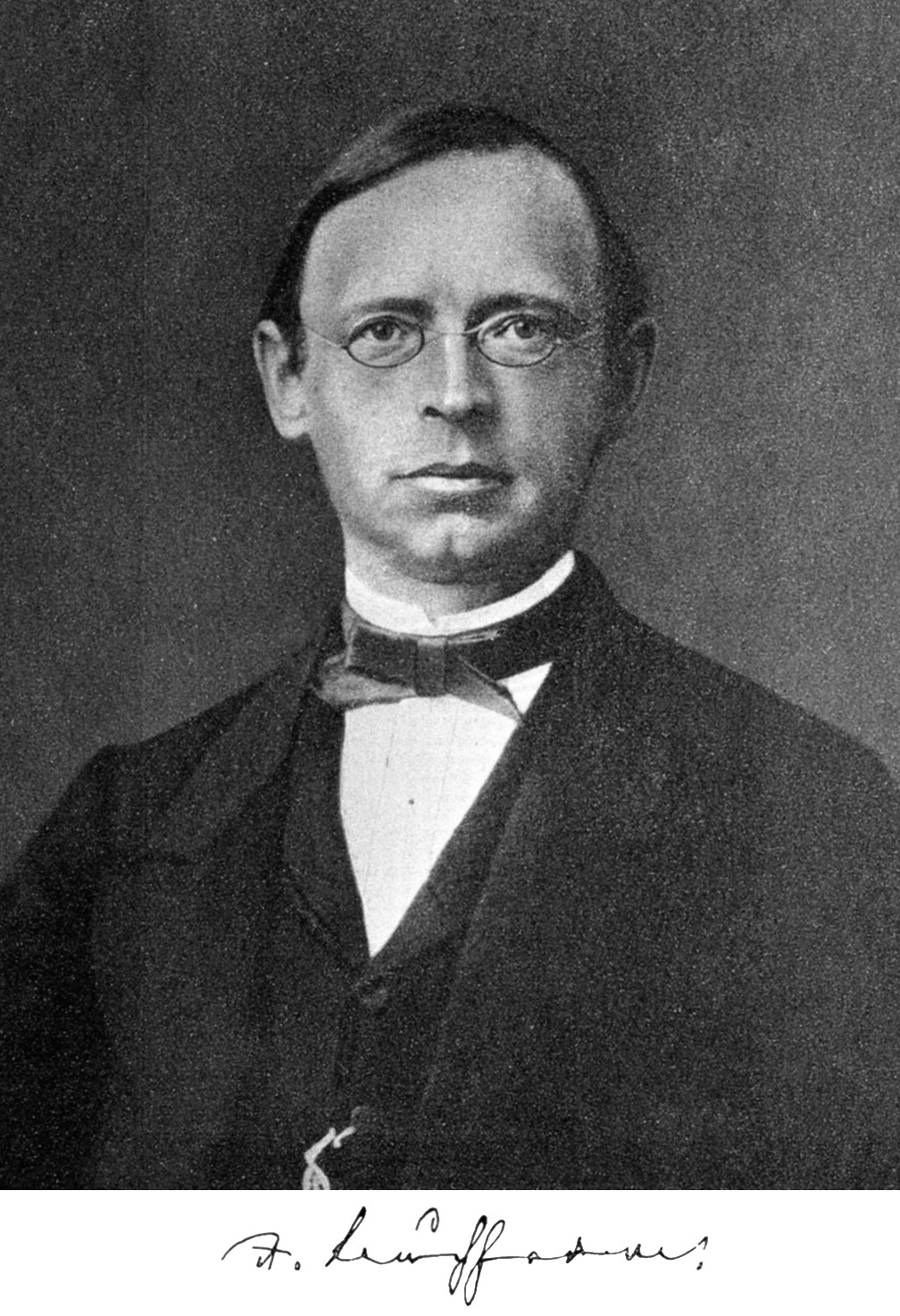
- Born: 1 March 1820; Bautzen
- Died: 25 December 1879 (aged 59); Giessen
- Alma mater: Leipzig University
- Occupation: Pharmacologist, physician, pharmacist
- Employer: Imperial University of Dorpat; University of Giessen

Rudolf Buchheim (1 March 1820 – 25 December 1879) was a German pharmacologist born in Bautzen (Budziszyn).

Rudolf Bucheim and his well-known student, chemist Oswald Schmiedeberg (1838–1921) are considered to be the founders of modern pharmacology, with Bucheim sometimes described as the "Father of Pharmacology".

== Career ==
On January 7, 1845 Buchheim received his doctorate from the University of Leipzig and on 28 February in 1847 he accepted a position as an associate professor of pharmacology, dietetics, history of medicine and medical literature at the Imperial University of Dorpat. He converted part of his own home into the first pharmacological laboratory, financing the research himself and training his students there. In 1849 he was chosen as a full professor of pharmacology. By 1856 he had established the first pharmacological institute at Dorpat, moving into the laboratory space even before it was finished. In 1866 Buchheim received an offer of a professorship from the University of Giessen, where he remained until his death.

== Research ==
Buchheim is remembered for his pioneer work in experimental pharmacology. He was instrumental in turning pharmacology from an empirical study of medicine into an independent medical discipline. Buchheim introduced two principles which helped to establish a scientific foundation for therapeutics, which he saw as "a new era of pharmacology". First was the classification of drugs into a natural system" based on mode of action, through scientific experiment, statistical analysis. and the understanding of drug effects. Second, through the founding pharmacological laboratories and training of others, he systematically explored experimental pharmacological and created a methodology for determining the quantitative and medical aspects of chemical substances. In this way he established pharmacology as an independent science with its own philosophy and methods.

"If we translate our often obscure ideas about drug actions into an exact physiological language: this should, without doubt, be a considerable achievement. However, scientific cognition of the action of a given drug would imply our ability to deduce each of its actions from its chemical formula." Buchheim

While at Leipzig, Buchheim translated Jonathan Pereira's (1804–1853) textbook The Elements of Materia Medica from English into German. Buchheim also edited the book, eliminating obsolete and ineffectual medicines and practices, while adding updated information, including a chapter of his own called Art der Wirkung ("The Mode of Action"). He was also the author of a well-received textbook on pharmacology, titled Lehrbuch der Arzneimittellehre (1856).

The Rudolf Buchheim Institute for Pharmacology is located at the University of Giessen.
