= Otto Schultzen =

German physician (1837–1875)

Karl Ludwig Wilhelm Otto Schultzen (16 July 1837 – 7 December 1875) was a German medical doctor born in Lissa.

He studied medicine at the Universities of Königsberg and Berlin, earning his doctorate in 1862 with the thesis Deinanition, accedit observatio et exploratio microscopica. Afterwards he was an assistant to Friedrich Theodor von Frerichs (1819–1885) at the medical clinic in Berlin. He gained his habilitation in 1867, and in 1871 became a professor of clinical medicine at the Imperial University of Dorpat. He died four years later at the age of 38.

With Marceli Nencki (1847–1901) he performed physiological studies of urea, discovering that amino acids (glycine and leucine) are intermediate links between protein and urea., With Bernhard Naunyn (1839–1925) he conducted important research involving the behavior of benzene-derived hydrocarbons in the body.
