= Leszno =

- City county
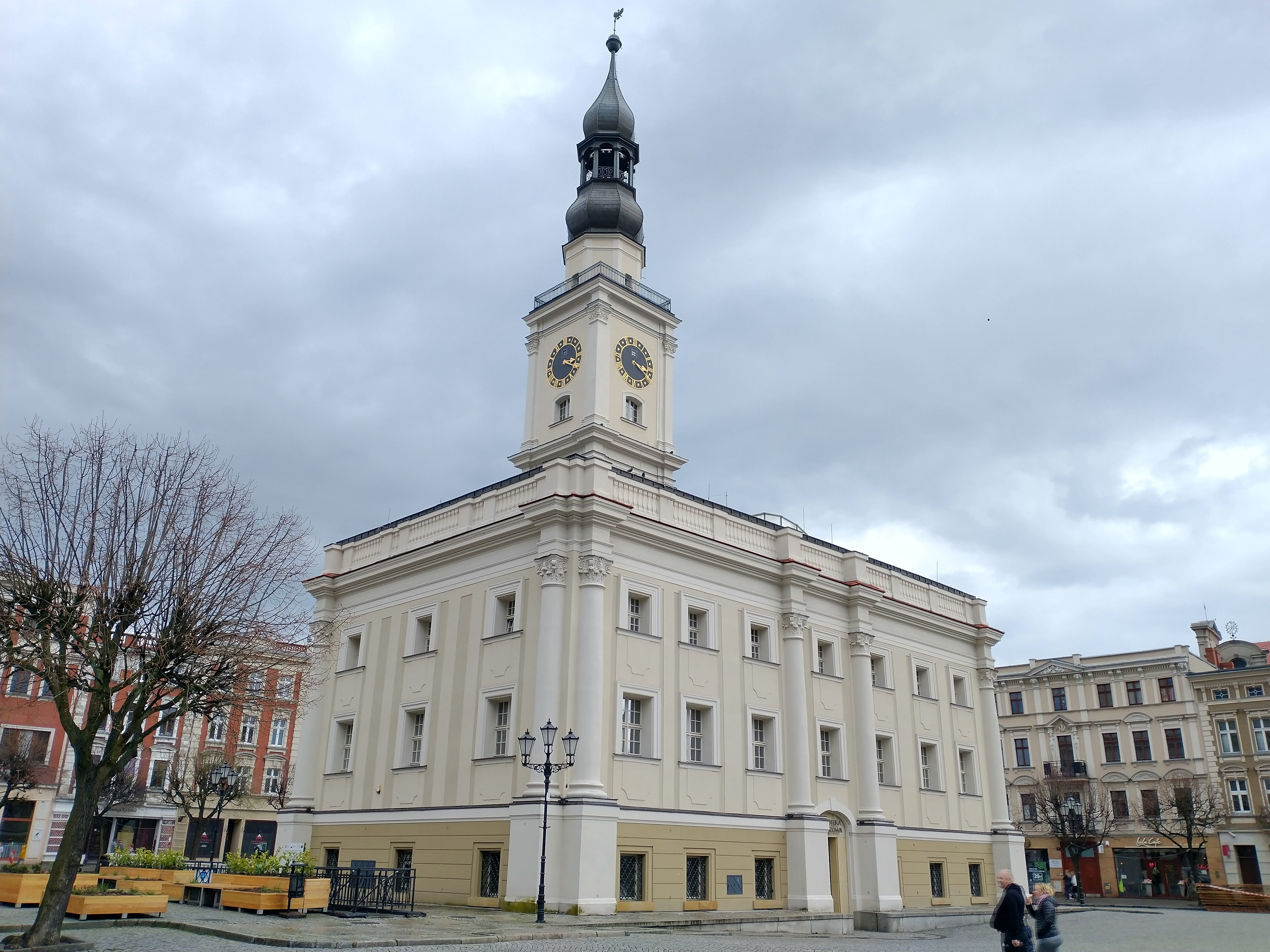
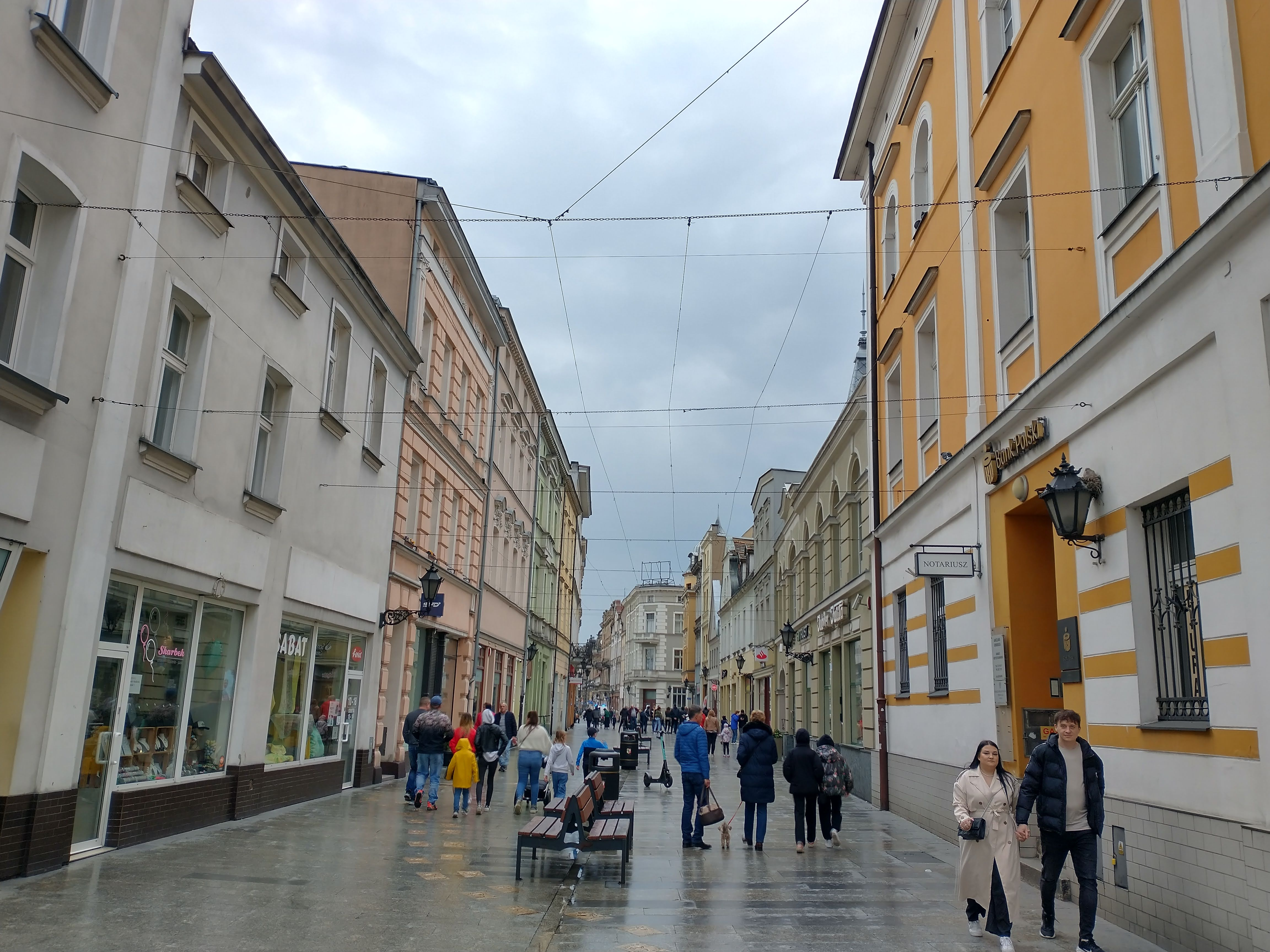
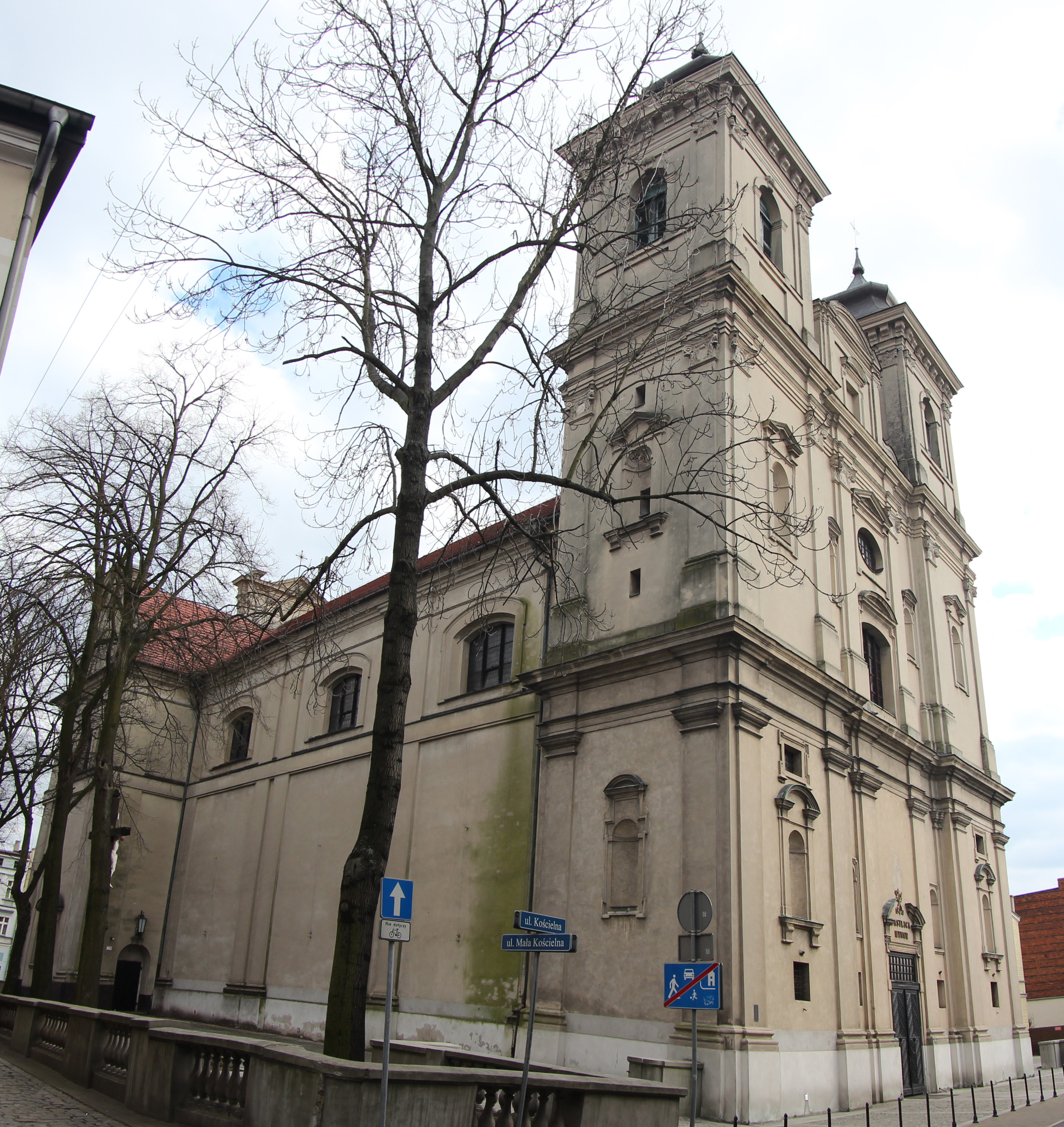
- Old Market Square and Town Hall Tenements at Leszno's Old Town St. Nicholas' Church

- Flag Coat of arms Brandmark
- Motto(s): "Leszno — rozwiń skrzydła" "Leszno — spread your wings"
- Location within Poland
- Coordinates: 51°50′45″N 16°34′50″E
- Country: Poland
- Voivodeship: Greater Poland
- County: city county
- First mentioned: 1393
- City rights: 1547

Government
  - City mayor: Grzegorz Rusiecki (KO)

Area
  - Total: 31.9 km^{2} (12.3 sq mi)

Population (31 December 2024)
  - Total: 59 521 ▼
  - Density: 1.8/km^{2} (4.8/sq mi)
- Time zone: UTC+1 (CET)
  - Summer (DST): UTC+2 (CEST)
- Postal code: 64-100 to 64-110
- Area code: +48 065
- Car plates: PL
- Website: www.leszno.pl

Leszno (Polish pronunciation: [ˈlɛʂnɔ]; German: Lissa (Note: Also called Polnisch Lissa as opposed to Deutsch Lissa.) [ˈlɪsa]) is a historic city in western Poland, seat of Leszno County within the Greater Poland Voivodeship. It is the seventh-largest city in the province with an estimated population of 59 521, as of 2024.

Leszno is a former residential city of prominent Polish magnate families of Leszczyński and Sułkowski, including King Stanisław Leszczyński, under whose patronage it flourished to become one of the major economic and cultural centers of Greater Poland, as reflected in the variety of landmarks, especially of the Baroque period.

Located on a highway and railway line at about half the distance between the two main cities of western Poland, Poznań and Wrocław, Leszno is the largest city of south-western Greater Poland and a major location for industry, services and tourism. It is particularly well known as the location of an annual air show with attendance reaching tens of thousands of people from various countries, and as the home of Unia Leszno, one of the most accomplished motorcycle speedway clubs.

== History ==
=== Early history ===
The city's unrecorded history dates to the 13th century. It was first mentioned in historical documents in 1393, when the estate was the property of a noble named Stefan Karnin-Wieniawa. The family eventually adopted the name Leszczyński (literal meaning "of Leszno"), derived from the name of their estate, as was the custom among the Polish nobility.

=== 16th–18th centuries ===
In around 1516, a community of Protestants known as the Unity of the Brethren (Unitas fratrum) were expelled from the Bohemian lands by King Vladislaus II and settled in Leszno. They were invited by the Leszczyński family, imperial counts since 1473 and who had converted to Calvinism.

In 1547 Leszno became a town by a privilege according to Magdeburg Law granted by King Sigismund I of Poland. Leszno was a private town, administratively located in the Wschowa County in the Poznań Voivodeship in the Greater Poland Province. In 1555, Rafał Leszczyński founded a school, and his son Andrzej Leszczyński then transformed it into a humanities gymnasium. During the Thirty Years' War, in the 1620s, Rafał Leszczyński admitted religious refugees from Silesia, Bohemia, and Moravia to Leszno. Weavers from Silesia contributed to the city's economic development.

In 1630, a printing house run by the Czech Brethren was established, where publications in Polish, Czech, and Latin were printed, including publications for Greater Poland and Lesser Poland, as well as for schools in Leszno and Sieraków. In 1633, a Lutheran printing house was established.

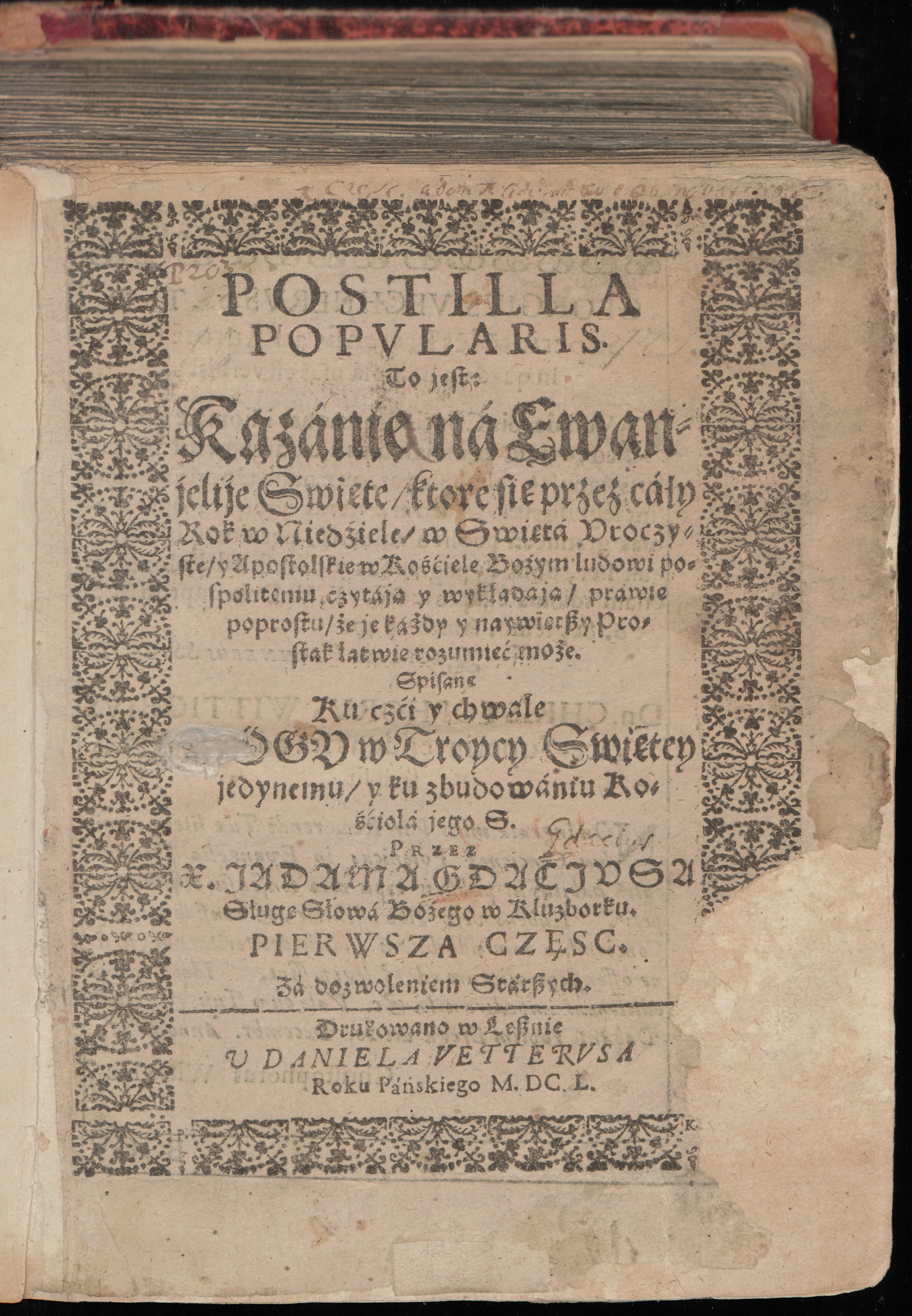
Polish postil published in Leszno in 1651

In 1631, Leszno was vested with further privileges by King Sigismund III Vasa, who made it equal with the most important cities of Poland such as Kraków, Gdańsk and Warsaw. The city attracted writers and scholars, such as mathematician and poet Maciej Głoskowski, and scholar and physician John Jonston. Reformation historian Andrzej Węgierski and educator and the last bishop of the Unity of the Brethren Jan Amos Komenský served as rectors of the gymnasium in Leszno. Johann Heermann, a German-speaking poet, lived in Leszno from 1638 until his death in 1647. Between 1636 and 1639, the city became fortified and its area increased. Theatrical plays were staged in Leszno, and the character of Harlequin appeared here for the first time in Poland. City's benefactor Rafał Leszczyński was himself a poet, voivode and politician, and his son Stanisław Leszczyński became King of Poland.

The era of Leszno's prosperity and cultural prominence ended during the Second Northern War, when the city was burnt down on 28 April 1656 by Polish forces faithful to King John Cassimir Vasa in retribution for letting in Swedish forces by protestant majority of burghers. Quickly rebuilt afterwards, it was set on fire again during the Great Northern War by Russian forces in 1707 and was ravaged by plague in 1709.

The Leszczyński family owned the city until 1738, when King Stanislaus I Leszczynski sold it to Aleksander Józef Sułkowski following his abdication. One of two main routes connecting Warsaw and Dresden ran through Leszno in the 18th century and Kings Augustus II the Strong and Augustus III of Poland often traveled that route.

=== 19th–20th centuries ===
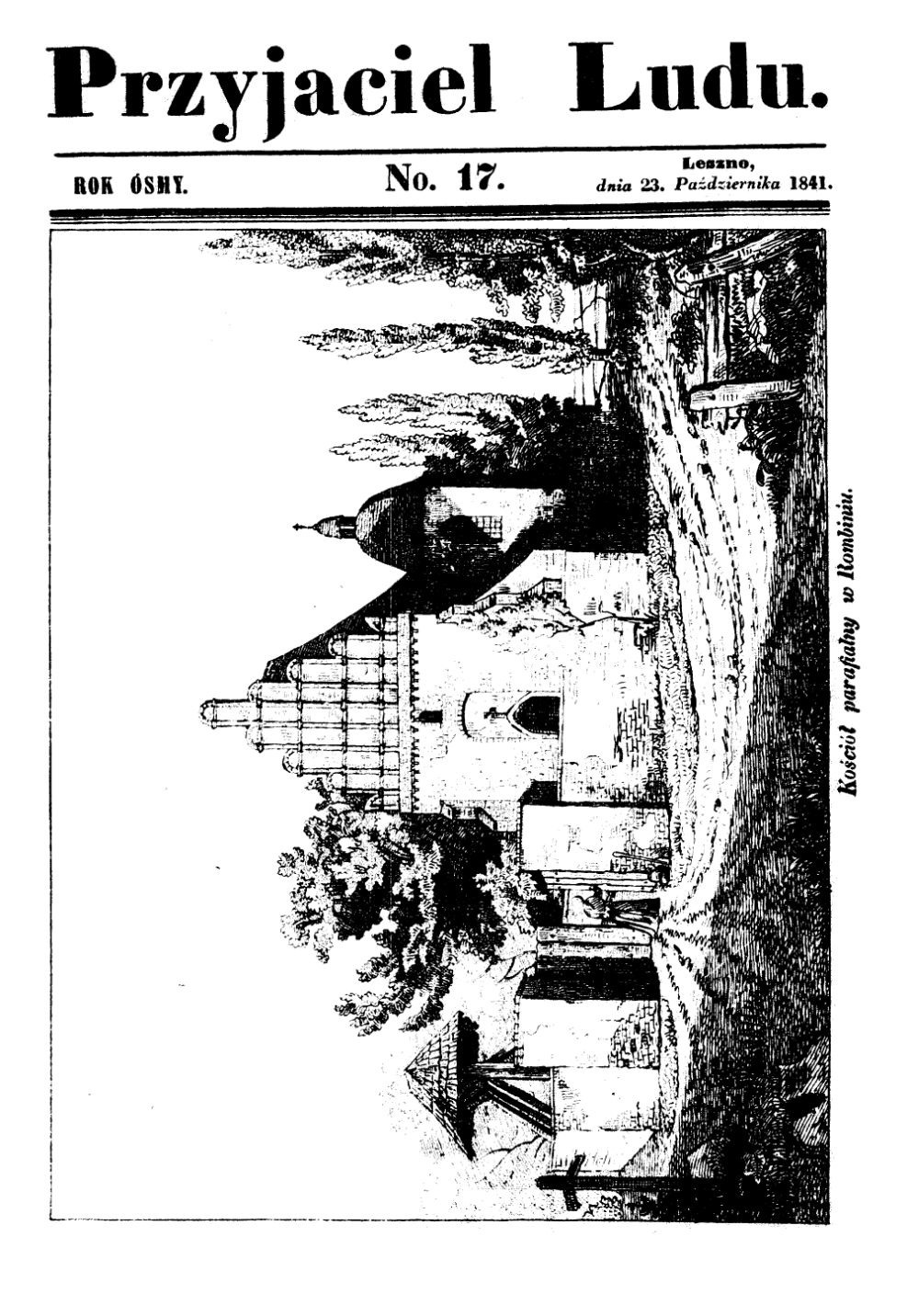
Przyjaciel Ludu, 19th-century Polish press from Leszno

In the Second Partition of Poland in 1793, Leszno was annexed by the Kingdom of Prussia, within which it was referred to as Lissa. Following the successful Greater Poland uprising of 1806, it was regained by Poles and included within the short-lived Duchy of Warsaw.

After the duchy's dissolution in 1815, the city was reannexed by Prussia, initially as part of the semi-autonomous Grand Duchy of Posen. The city was subjected to Germanisation policies. Nevertheless, Polish press was issued in the city (Przyjaciel Ludu) and in the 1840s, Polish historian, geographer and former officer Stanisław Plater published the Mała Encyklopedia Polska ("Little Polish Encyclopedia"), one of the pioneering 19th-century Polish encyclopedias, in the city. In the 19th century, the city was a thriving center of Polish printing. The local school actively fought to preserve its Polish character in opposition to the Germanisation policies of the Prussian administration. In 1871 it became part of Germany, and in 1887, it became the administrative seat of the Prussian Kreis Lissa. According to the 1910 census, the population of the city was 17,156, of whom 14,479 (84%) reported German as their sole mother tongue, while 2,365 (14%) reported Polish; the Jewish population was 802 (4.6%).

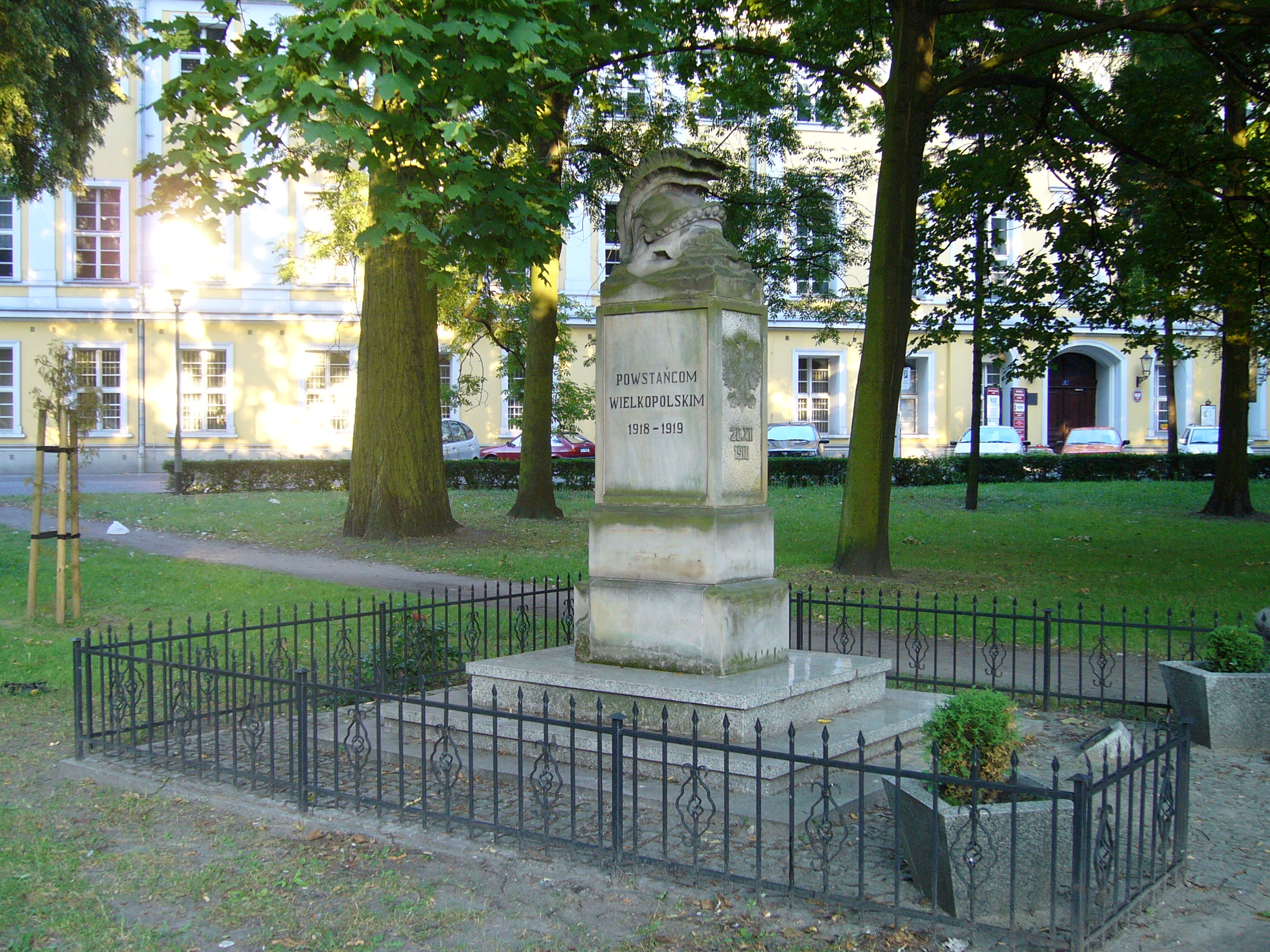
Greater Poland Uprising Monument

After World War I, in November 1918, Poland regained independence. Shortly after the Greater Poland Uprising of 1918–19 broke out, attempting to reintegrate Greater Poland and Leszno with Poland. The first local battles of the uprising took place in the area on 28 December 1918. Though the city was located on the German side of the military demarcation line established following the ceasefire in February 1919, Leszno became part of the newly established Second Polish Republic under the Treaty of Versailles, with effect from 17 January 1920. The local populace had to acquire Polish citizenship. In the interbellum, Leszno was a county seat within the Polish Poznań Voivodeship. In 1924, a monument dedicated to the Polish insurgents of 1918–19 was erected.

==== World War II ====
Following the joint German–Soviet invasion of Poland, which started World War II in September 1939, the city was annexed by Nazi Germany and incorporated into Reichsgau Wartheland. During the invasion, in September 1939, the Nazi Einsatzgruppen entered the city to commit atrocities against the population. The Germans carried out mass arrests of Poles accused of "anti-German activities". Attending church services and having private meetings in Polish households were considered suspect activities. A prison for Poles was established in the local monastery, where more than 200 people had already been imprisoned in September 1939 during the Intelligenzaktion.

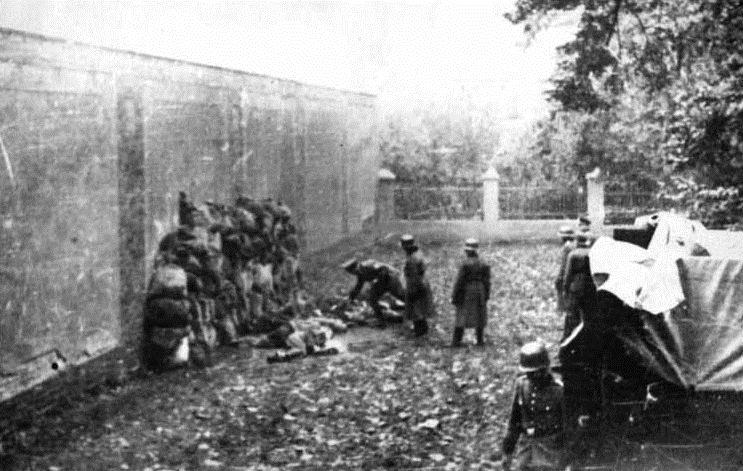
German execution of Poles in Leszno on 21 October 1939

Most of the city's Jewish inhabitants and other remaining Poles were killed by the Nazis. A notable public execution of 20 Poles, members of the "Sokół" Polish Gymnastic Society, former Polish insurgents of 1918–1919, a local teacher, and a lawyer, was carried out in Leszno by the Einsatzgruppe VI on 21 October 1939. Poles who were initially imprisoned in Leszno were also murdered in nearby towns and villages of Poniec, Osieczna, Włoszakowice and Rydzyna.

By late 1939, the Germans had expelled over 1,000 Poles, including families of Poles murdered in various massacres, in addition teachers, local officials, activists, former insurgents, and owners of shops and workshops, which were then handed over to German colonists as part of the Lebensraum policy. A transit camp for Poles expelled from various nearby settlements was established in the local school. Poles were held there several days, their money, valuables and food were confiscated, and then they were either deported to Tomaszów Mazowiecki or Łódź in German-occupied central Poland or sent to local German colonists or to Germany as slave labour.

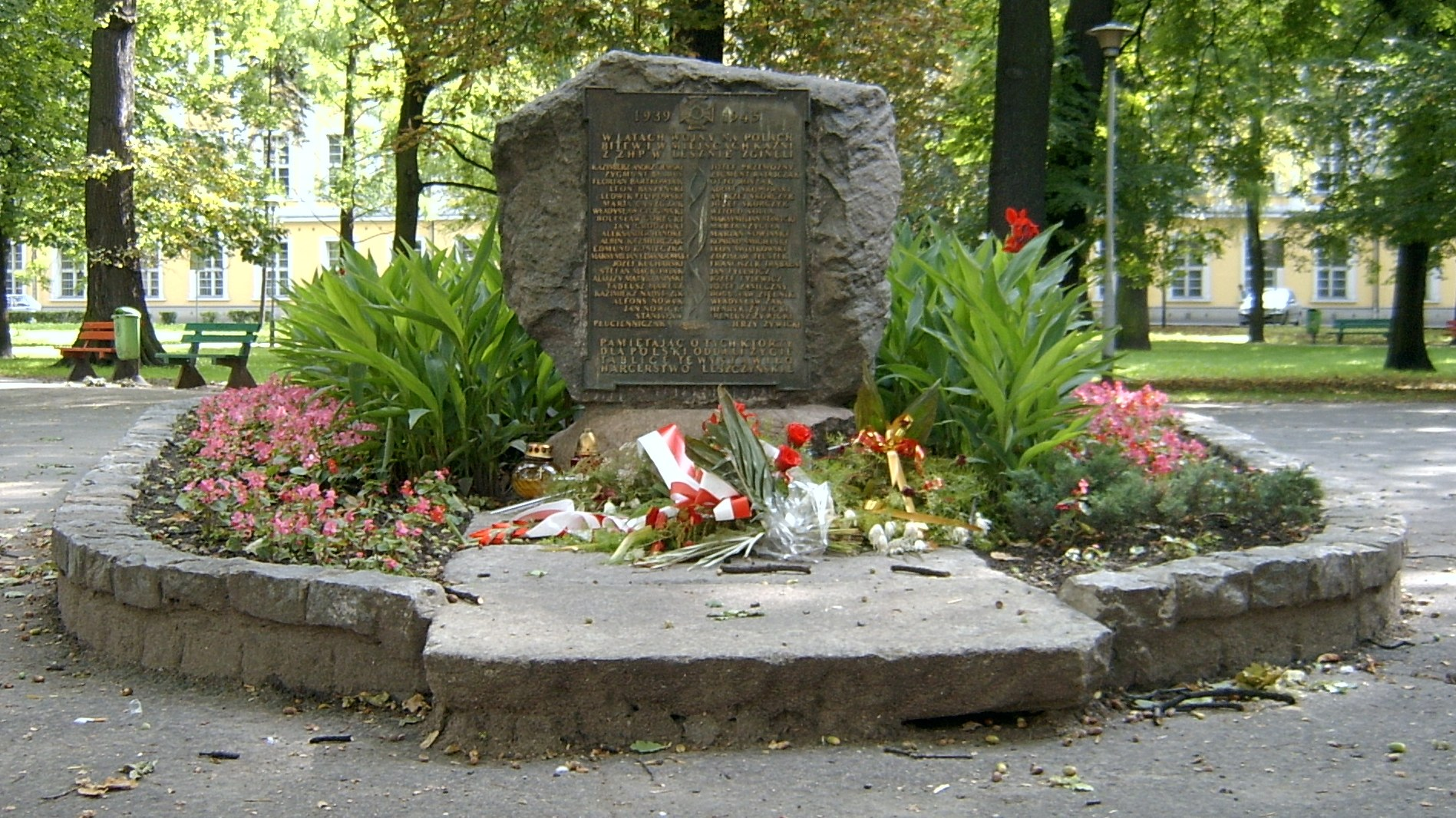
Memorial to the members of the Polish Scouting Association, murdered in World War II

The occupiers established and operated a forced labour subcamp of the Stalag XXI-D prisoner-of-war camp in the city.

At least 30 Poles who were either born or lived in Leszno perished in the Katyn massacre committed by the Russians in April–May 1940. Those killed included including 20 graduates of local high schools and colleges, a local judge, a sprinter of the local "Sokół" Polish Gymnastic Society, and several policemen.

Despite such circumstances, local Poles organized an underground resistance movement, which included the Ogniwo and Świt organizations, the secret youth organization Tajna Siódemka and structures of the Polish Underground State. Polish underground press was printed in Leszno. The local branch of the Home Army was crushed by the occupiers in July 1944. The German occupation ended in 1945, and the city returned to Poland, although with a Soviet-installed communist regime, which stayed in power until the Fall of Communism in the 1980s.

==== Post-war history ====
In the following years, the Polish anti-communist resistance was active in Leszno, including the Wielkopolska Samodzielna Grupa Ochotnicza Warta (Greater Poland Independent Volunteer Group "Warta") and the "Zawisza" Home Army. The pre-war monument of the Greater Poland insurgents was restored in 1957. The city underwent a period of fast development especially between 1975 and 1998 when it was a seat of a voivodeship administrative area. In 1991, a monument to the Constitution of 3 May 1791 and the heroes of the fights for Poland's independence was unveiled, and in 1995, a memorial to the victims of the Katyn massacre was unveiled. From 1975 to 1998, it was the capital of the Leszno Voivodeship. In 2000, the city was awarded "The Golden Star of Town Twinning" prize by the European Commission.

== Climate ==
Leszno has an oceanic climate (Köppen: Cfb) although notably with warm summer continental characteristics (Dfb), typical of inland west and south polish.

Climate data for Leszno (1991–2020 normals, extremes 1958–present)
Month	Jan	Feb	Mar	Apr	May	Jun	Jul	Aug	Sep	Oct	Nov	Dec	Year
Record high °C (°F)	16.9 (62.4)	20.4 (68.7)	24.0 (75.2)	30.0 (86.0)	31.6 (88.9)	37.6 (99.7)	37.0 (98.6)	37.8 (100.0)	34.9 (94.8)	27.5 (81.5)	20.1 (68.2)	16.6 (61.9)	37.8 (100.0)
Mean daily maximum °C (°F)	2.5 (36.5)	4.2 (39.6)	8.5 (47.3)	15.1 (59.2)	19.7 (67.5)	23.1 (73.6)	25.4 (77.7)	25.1 (77.2)	19.8 (67.6)	13.8 (56.8)	7.6 (45.7)	3.6 (38.5)	14.0 (57.2)
Daily mean °C (°F)	−0.3 (31.5)	0.6 (33.1)	3.9 (39.0)	9.2 (48.6)	13.8 (56.8)	17.2 (63.0)	19.3 (66.7)	18.9 (66.0)	14.2 (57.6)	9.1 (48.4)	4.3 (39.7)	0.9 (33.6)	9.3 (48.7)
Mean daily minimum °C (°F)	−3.2 (26.2)	−2.7 (27.1)	−0.2 (31.6)	3.4 (38.1)	7.8 (46.0)	11.1 (52.0)	13.2 (55.8)	13.1 (55.6)	9.2 (48.6)	5.1 (41.2)	1.4 (34.5)	−1.8 (28.8)	4.7 (40.5)
Record low °C (°F)	−28.8 (−19.8)	−26.9 (−16.4)	−24.4 (−11.9)	−7.4 (18.7)	−4.3 (24.3)	−1.4 (29.5)	2.2 (36.0)	0.8 (33.4)	−3.3 (26.1)	−8.0 (17.6)	−15.8 (3.6)	−25.5 (−13.9)	−28.8 (−19.8)
Average precipitation mm (inches)	35.5 (1.40)	31.3 (1.23)	39.8 (1.57)	28.8 (1.13)	53.6 (2.11)	57.6 (2.27)	77.5 (3.05)	70.4 (2.77)	46.5 (1.83)	38.2 (1.50)	34.4 (1.35)	35.7 (1.41)	549.2 (21.62)
Average extreme snow depth cm (inches)	4.0 (1.6)	4.6 (1.8)	2.5 (1.0)	0.6 (0.2)	0.0 (0.0)	0.0 (0.0)	0.0 (0.0)	0.0 (0.0)	0.0 (0.0)	0.2 (0.1)	1.5 (0.6)	3.6 (1.4)	4.6 (1.8)
Average precipitation days (≥ 0.1 mm)	17.13	14.60	14.03	10.83	13.23	13.00	14.17	13.10	11.60	13.83	14.73	17.63	167.90
Average snowy days (≥ 0 cm)	12.7	11.8	4.9	0.7	0.0	0.0	0.0	0.0	0.0	0.1	2.3	8.2	40.7
Average relative humidity (%)	86.7	83.3	78.0	69.6	70.8	71.3	70.8	71.4	78.3	83.7	88.7	88.2	78.4
Mean monthly sunshine hours	53.9	76.2	123.9	204.1	245.0	246.9	255.1	244.0	165.1	113.3	58.5	43.2	1,829.4
Source 1: Institute of Meteorology and Water Management
Source 2: Meteomodel.pl (records, relative humidity 1991–2020)

== Transport ==
Leszno is bypassed by the S5 expressway to the west. Exits 47, 46 and 45 of the expressway provide quick access to Poznań and Wrocław.

Leszno has a station on the Poznań–Wrocław railway line.

Railway lines from Głogów and Ostrów Wielkopolski also converge in Leszno.

Leszno-Strzyżewice Airport (ICAO code EPLS) is a grass airfield in Strzyżewice, a village on the western edge of Leszno. There is no airline service. The airfield is an important gliding site. The "Antidotum Airshow" is held at Leszno each year.

== Sports ==
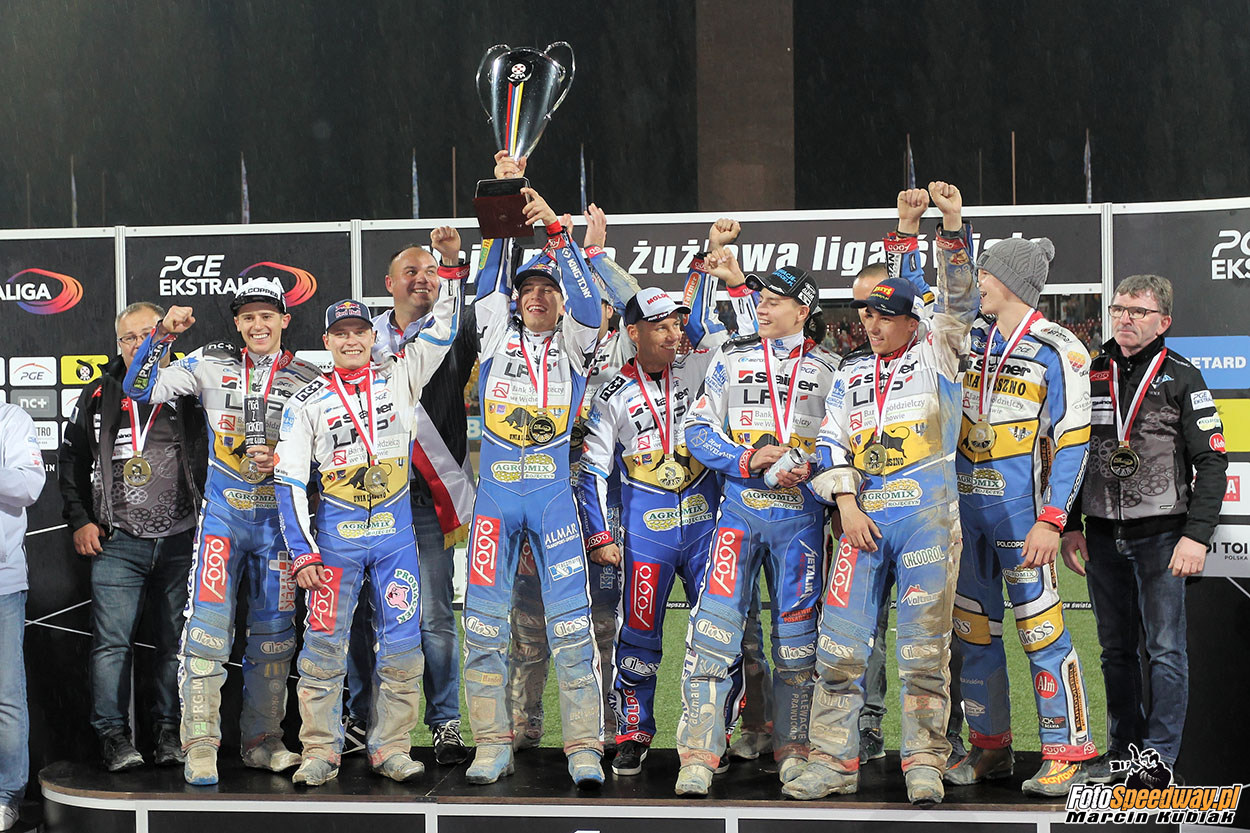
Unia Leszno speedway riders celebrating the Polish Championship in 2017

- Unia Leszno speedway club

The Leszno motorcycle club was founded on 8 May 1938. The club was re-established on 2 May 1946 after World War II. On 28 July 1949 the Leszno motorcycle club changed its name to Unia Leszno Speedway Club. Some rules and regulations were revised as well. The Unia Leszno has been a very successful club that has won many awards and medals throughout the years. The Unia Leszno Speedway Club has won over 78 different medals since the formation of the club.

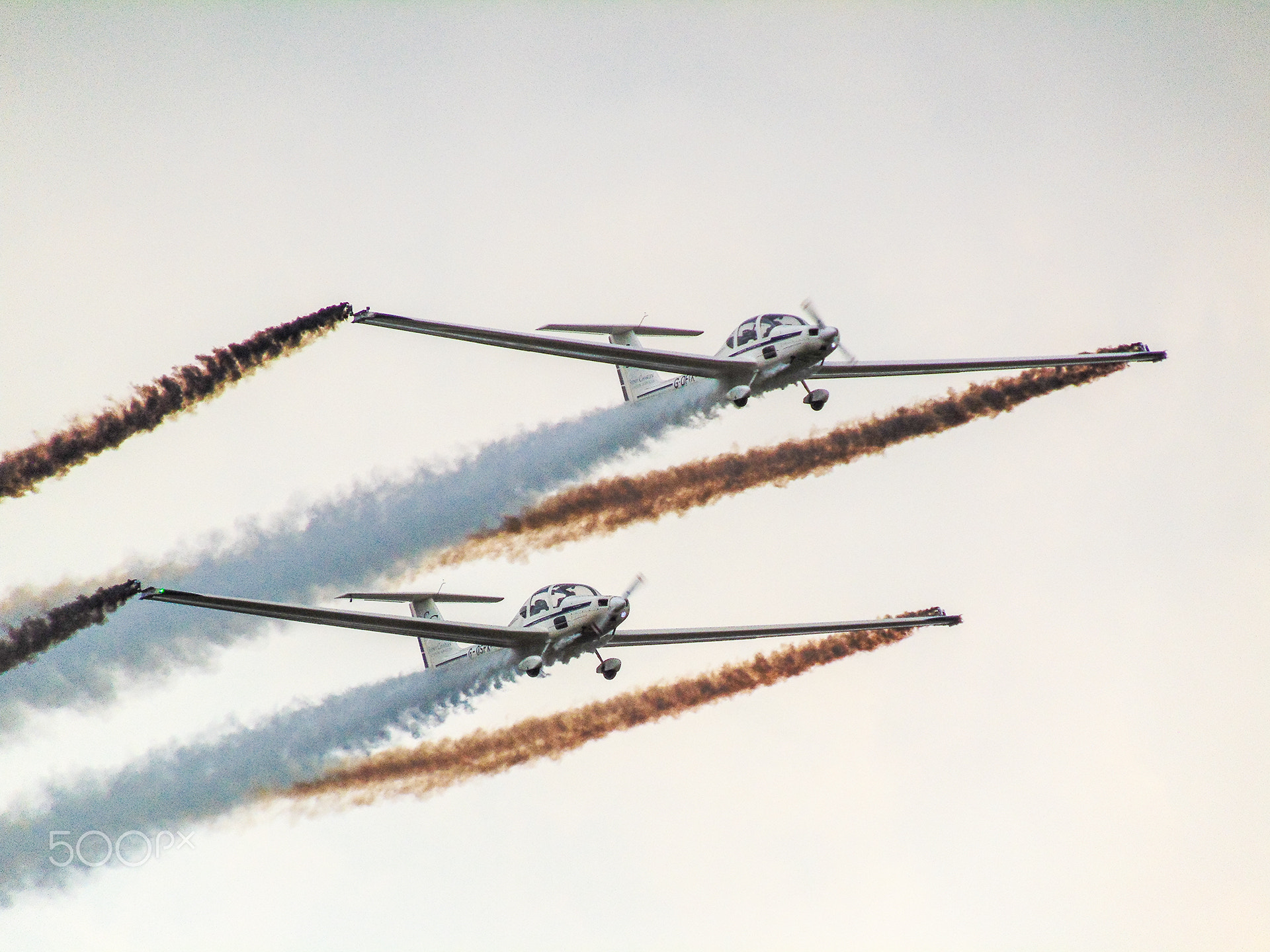
Airshow Leszno

- Leszno Aero Club

The Leszno Aero Club is the largest airfield in the Wielkopolska area. The Aero Club belongs to the Polish Aero Club central gliding school. The Aero Club in Leszno hosted the world gliding championship in 1958, 1969, and 2003. It is the only place that has done so. The Aero Club also has a pilot school called the Central Gliding school. The school has been around for over 50 years and was managed by pilot Irena Kempówna in the 1950s and 1960s.

- KS Polonia Leszno

The Klub Sportowy Polonia Leszno was formed in 1912 in Leszno. It is an indoor soccer field. The first President of the club was Marcin Giera. The club did not gain much popularity until after World War II when official teams started playing there. Prior to World War I most of the people that played there were locals.

Leszno Old Town

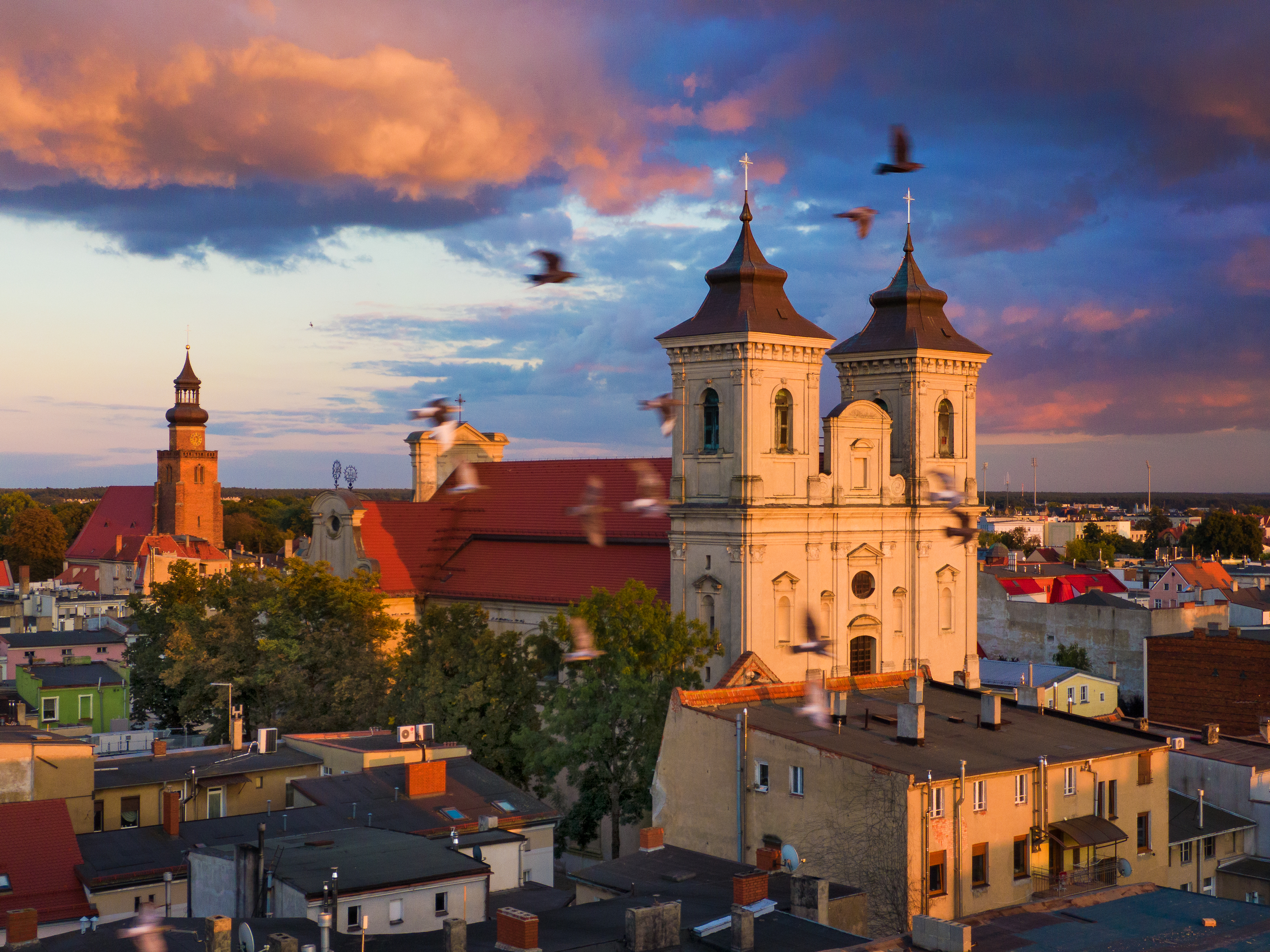
Baroque Basilica of Saint Nicholas

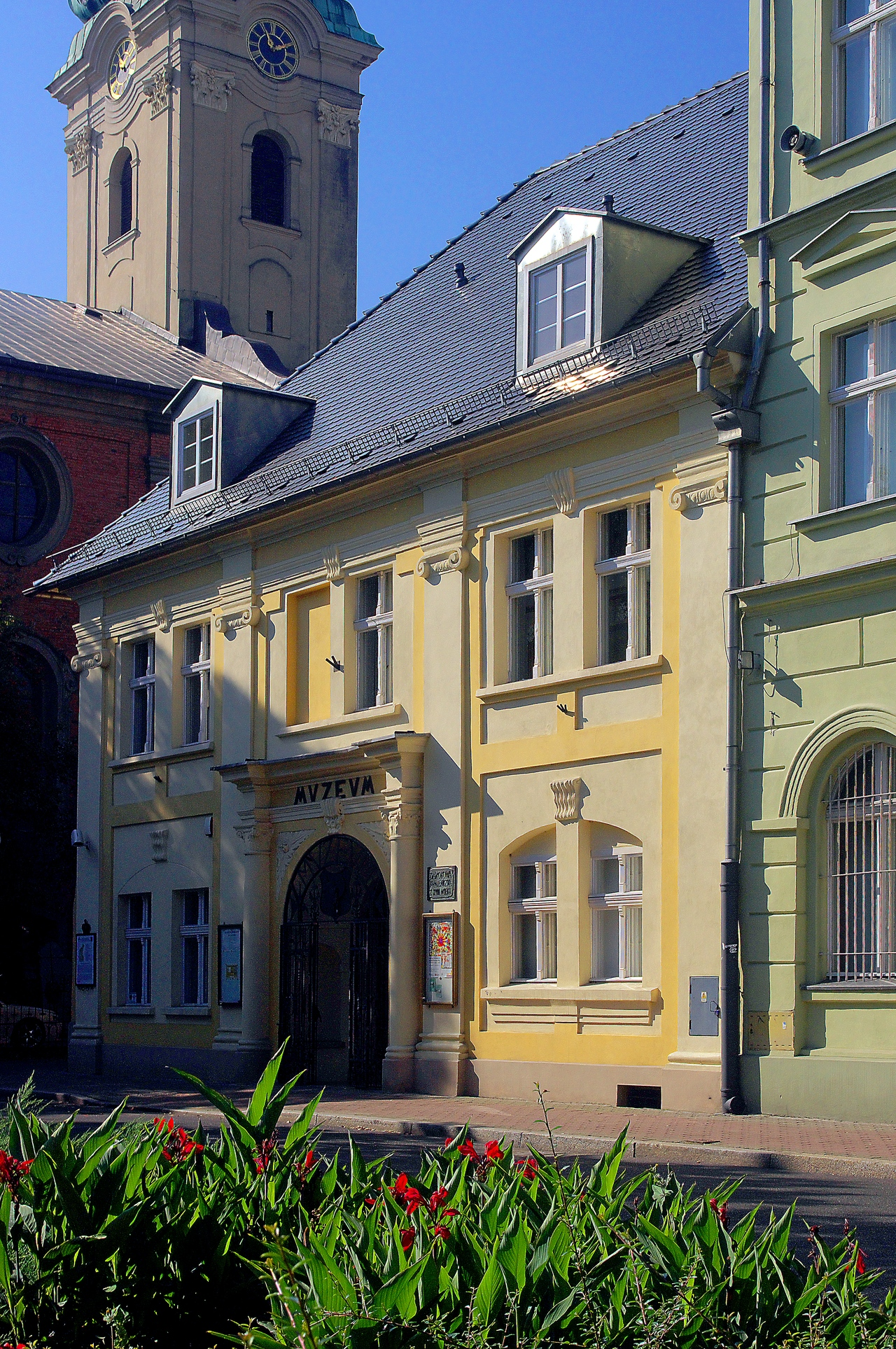
Regional Museum

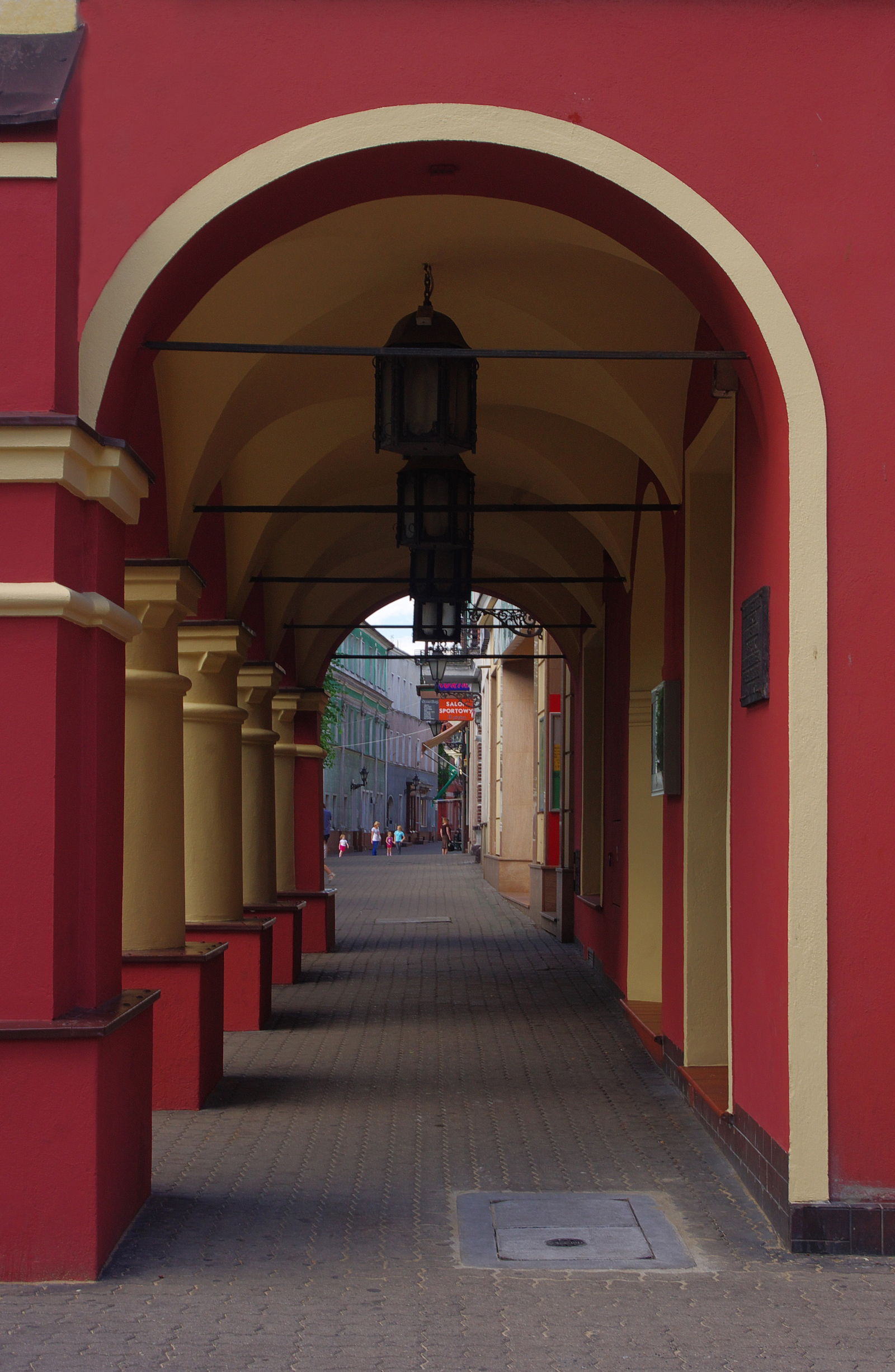
Arcades in the Market Square

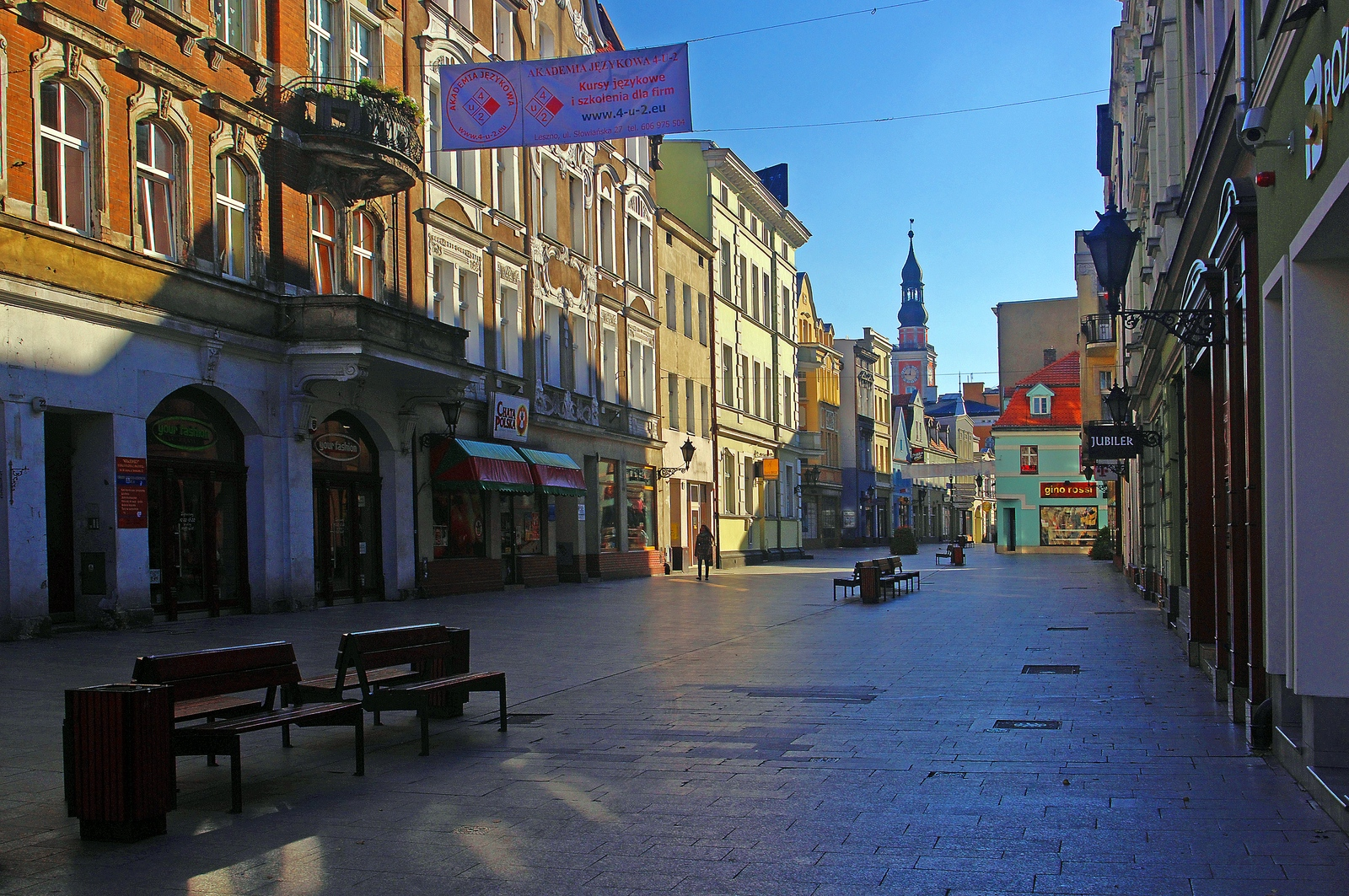
Słowiańska Street

== Education ==
=== Primary schools ===
- Szkoła Podstawowa nr 1 im. Marii Konopnickiej w Lesznie
- Szkoła Podstawowa nr 2 im. Obrońców Polskiego Morza w Lesznie
- Szkoła Podstawowa nr 3 im. Marii Skłodowskiej Curie w Lesznie
- Szkoła Podstawowa nr 4 im. Adama Mickiewicza w Lesznie
- Szkoła Podstawowa nr 5 im. Henryka Sienkiewicza w Lesznie
- Szkoła Podstawowa Specjalna nr 6 w Lesznie
- Szkoła Podstawowa nr 7 im. Wojska Polskiego w Lesznie
- Szkoła Podstawowa nr 9 im. ks.kardynała Stefana Wyszyńskiego w Lesznie
- Szkoła Podstawowa nr 10 im. Świętego Jana Pawła II w Lesznie
- Szkoła Podstawowa nr 12 im. Generała Dywizji Stefana Roweckiego „Grota” w Lesznie
- Szkoła Podstawowa nr 13 z Oddziałami Integracyjnymi im. Króla Stanisława Leszczyńskiego w Lesznie

=== Secondary schools ===
- I Liceum Ogólnokształcące im. Rodu Leszczyńskich w Lesznie
- II Liceum Ogólnokształcące im. Mikołaja Kopernika z Oddziałami Dwujęzycznymi i Międzynarodowymi w Lesznie
- III Liceum Ogólnokształcące im. Juliusza Słowackiego w Lesznie
- IV Liceum Ogólnokształcące im. Karola Kurpińskiego w Lesznie
- Prywatne Liceum Ogólnokształcące w Lesznie
- Pierwsze Prywatne Liceum Ogólnokształcące w Lesznie

=== Technical schools ===
- Zespół Szkół nr 4 im. Powstańców Wielkopolskich w Lesznie
- Zespół Szkół Ekonomicznych im. Jana Amosa Komeńskiego w Lesznie
- Zespół Szkół Technicznych – Centrum Kształcenia Zawodowego i Ustawicznegoim. 55 Poznańskiego Pułku Piechoty w Lesznie
- Zespół Szkół Rolniczo – Budowlanych im. Synów Pułku w Lesznie
- Zespół Szkół Elektroniczno – Telekomunikacyjnych w Lesznie

=== Colleges ===
- Akademia Nauk Stosowanych im. Jana Amosa Komeńskiego w Lesznie
- Wyższa Szkoła Humanistyczna im. króla Stanisława Leszczyńskiego w Lesznie

== Notable people ==
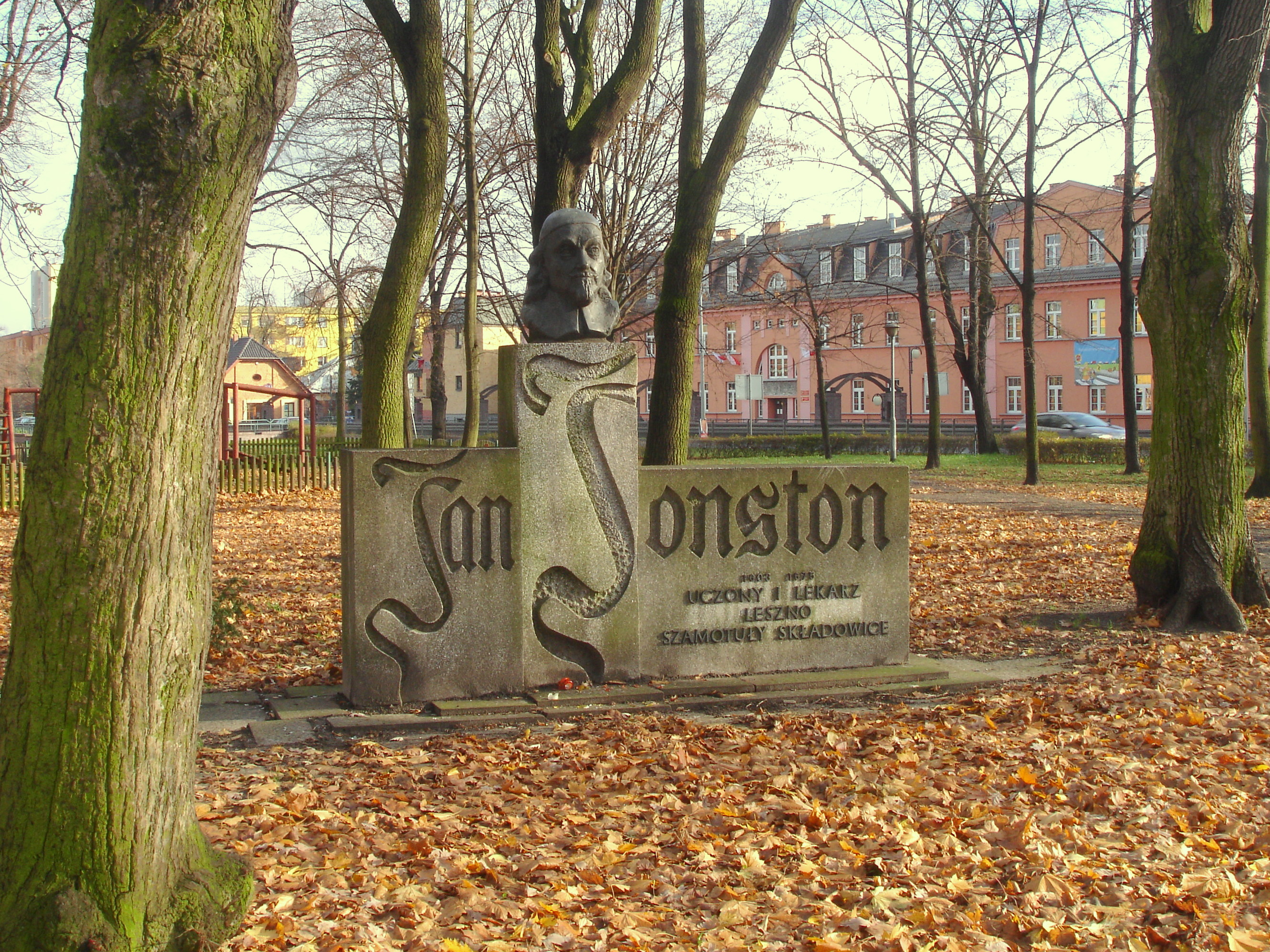
Jan Jonston Monument

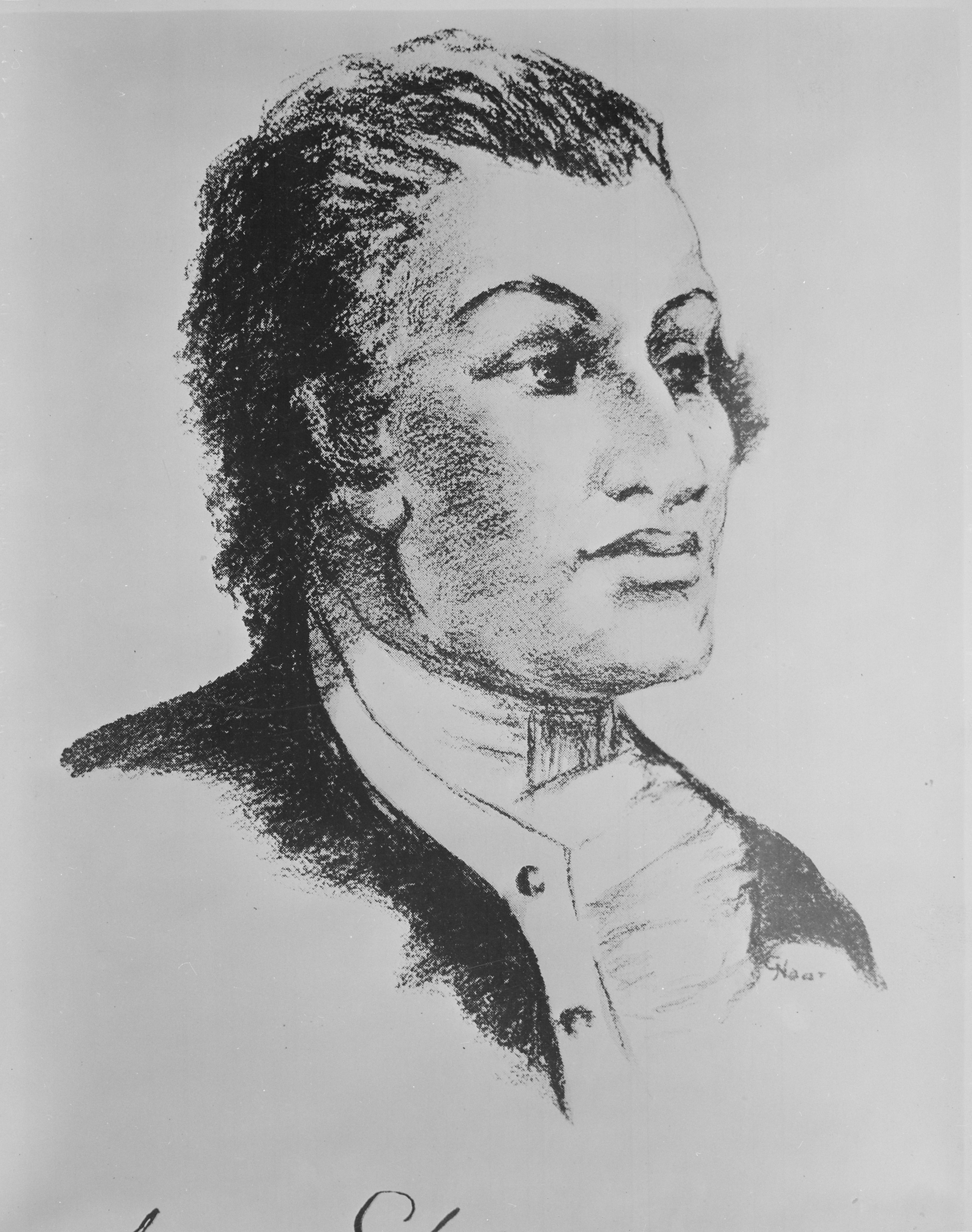
Haym Solomon

- Stephan Born (1824–1898), German revolutionary
- Rafał Dobrucki (born 1976), Polish speedway rider
- Stanisław Grochowiak (1934–1976), Polish poet and dramatist
- Ludwig Kalisch (1814–1882), German-Jewish novelist
- Zvi Hirsch Kalischer (1795–1874); German Orthodox rabbi
- Jan Jonston (1603–1675), Reformed teacher and scholar, physician
- Leser Landshuth (1817–1887), German Jewish liturgiologist
- Jacob of Lissa (1760–1832), a rabbi
- Albert Mosse (1846–1925), German judge and legal schola
- Carl Friedrich Richard Förster (1825–1902), German ophthalmologist
- Otto Schultzen (1837–1875), German physician
- Ottomar Anschütz (1846–1907), German inventor, photographer and chronophotographer
- Paul Cinquevalli (1859–1918), German-British artist
- Albert Moll (1862–1939) German psychiatrist
- Leo Baeck (1873–1956), German-Jewish rabbi, scholar, and theologian
- Rudolf Leonhard (1889–1953), German author and communist activist
- Wolfgang Martini (1891–1963), German general
- Ludwig Schulz (1896–1966), Luftwaffe general
- Gerhard Weisser (1898–1989) German social scientist
- Johannes Eisermann (1900–1976), Wehrmacht officer
- Wolfgang Thomale (1900–1978), German general
- Antoni Janusz (1902–2000), Polish sportsman and pilot
- Peter Lindbergh (1944–2019), German photographer and director
- Tomasz Parzy (born 1979), Polish footballer
- Krzysztof Kasprzak (born 1984), Polish speedway rider
- Ilse Schwidetzky (1907–1997), German anthropologist
- Haym Solomon (1740–1785), an important figure in the American Revolutionary War
- Daniel Strejc-Vetterus, Reformed printer and author of the oldest Polish guidebook of Iceland (1638)
- Carl Gottfried Woide (1725–1790), Reformed pastor, Orientalist and fellow of the British Royal Society

== International relations ==
=== Twin towns – Sister cities ===
Leszno is twinned with:

- Montluçon, France
- Deurne, Netherlands
- Suhl, Germany
- Dunaújváros, Hungary
