= Ogrody, Greater Poland Voivodeship =

Ogrody
- Village
- Location within Poland
- Coordinates: 51°50′11″N 16°28′47″E
- Country: Poland
- Voivodeship: Greater Poland
- County: Leszno
- Gmina: Święciechowa

Ogrody [ɔˈɡrɔdɨ] is a village in the administrative district of Gmina Święciechowa, within Leszno County, Greater Poland Voivodeship, in west-central Poland.
