= Osada Leśna =

Osada Leśna may refer to the following places in Poland:

- Osada Leśna, Lower Silesian Voivodeship, a village in the administrative district of Gmina Oleśnica in south-west Poland
- Osada Leśna, Greater Poland Voivodeship, a settlement in the administrative district of Gmina Święciechowa in west-central Poland
