= Trzebiny =

- Village
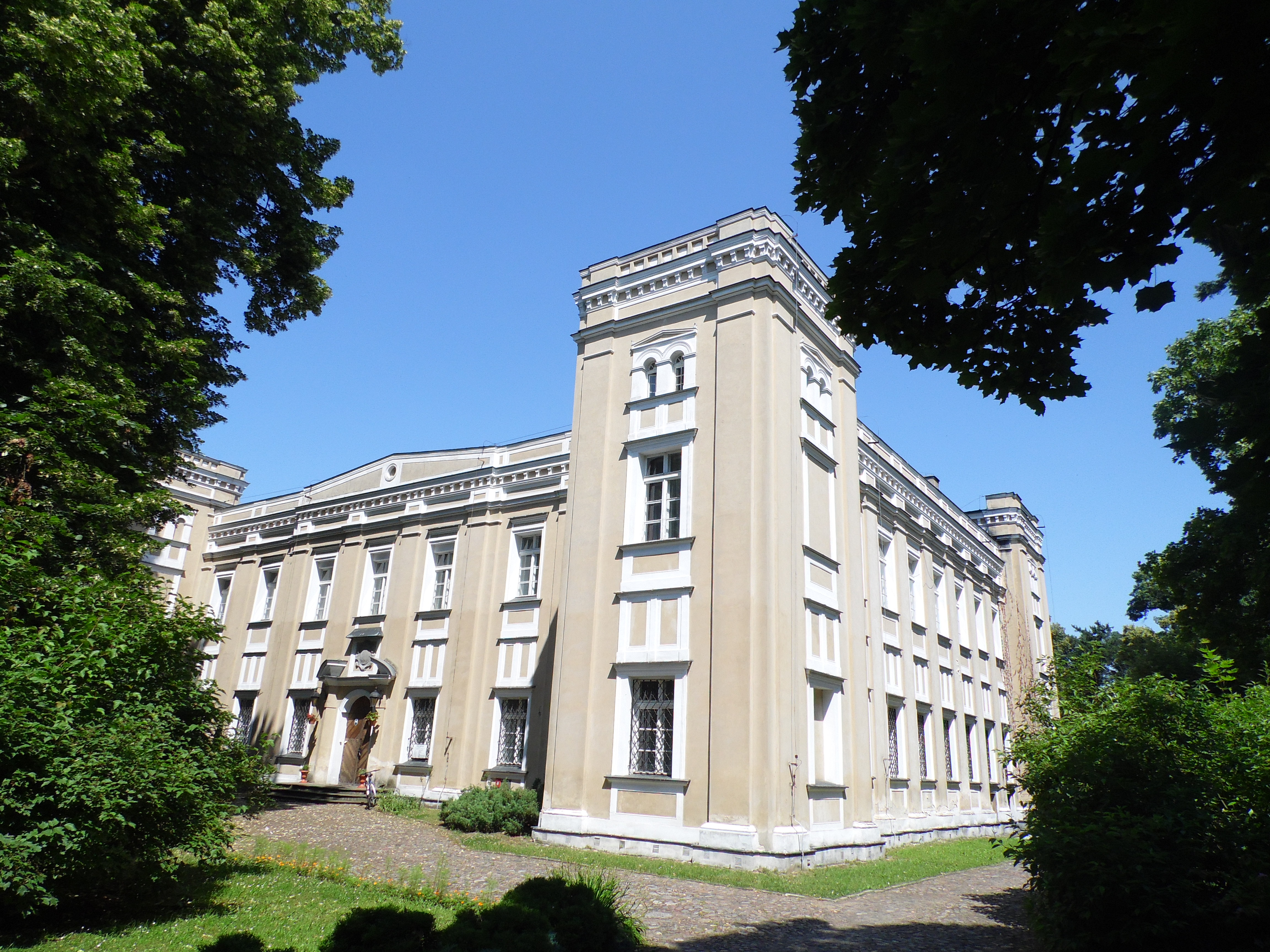
- Palace in the village

- Location within Poland
- Coordinates: 51°50′N 16°27′E
- Country: Poland
- Voivodeship: Greater Poland
- County: Leszno
- Gmina: Święciechowa

Trzebiny [tʂɛˈbinɨ] is a village in the administrative district of Gmina Święciechowa, within Leszno County, Greater Poland Voivodeship, in west-central Poland.
