= Przybyszewo, Greater Poland Voivodeship =

Przybyszewo
- Village
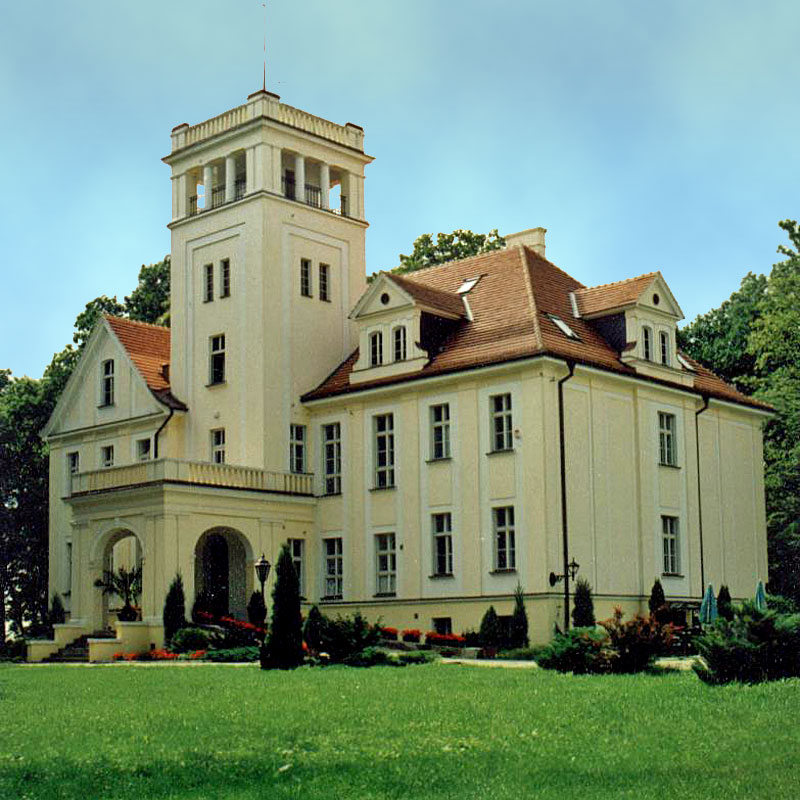
- Palace in Przybyszewo

- Location within Poland
- Coordinates: 51°48′17″N 16°28′55″E
- Country: Poland
- Voivodeship: Greater Poland
- County: Leszno
- Gmina: Święciechowa

Population
  - Total: 410

Przybyszewo [pʂɨbɨˈʂɛvɔ] is a village in the administrative district of Gmina Święciechowa, within Leszno County, Greater Poland Voivodeship, in west-central Poland.
