= Niechłód =

- Village
- Location within Poland
- Coordinates: 51°51′N 16°24′E
- Country: Poland
- Voivodeship: Greater Poland
- County: Leszno
- Gmina: Święciechowa

Niechłód [ˈɲɛxwut] is a village in the administrative district of Gmina Święciechowa, within Leszno County, Greater Poland Voivodeship, in west-central Poland.
