= Krzycko Małe =

- Village
- Location within Poland
- Coordinates: 51°53′35″N 16°26′54″E
- Country: Poland
- Voivodeship: Greater Poland
- County: Leszno
- Gmina: Święciechowa

Krzycko Małe [ˈkʂɨt͡skɔ ˈmawɛ] is a village in the administrative district of Gmina Święciechowa, within Leszno County, Greater Poland Voivodeship, in west-central Poland.

Famous writer and poet of Polish renaissance, Primate of Poland Andreas Cricius was born there in 1482.
