= Książęcy Las =

- Village
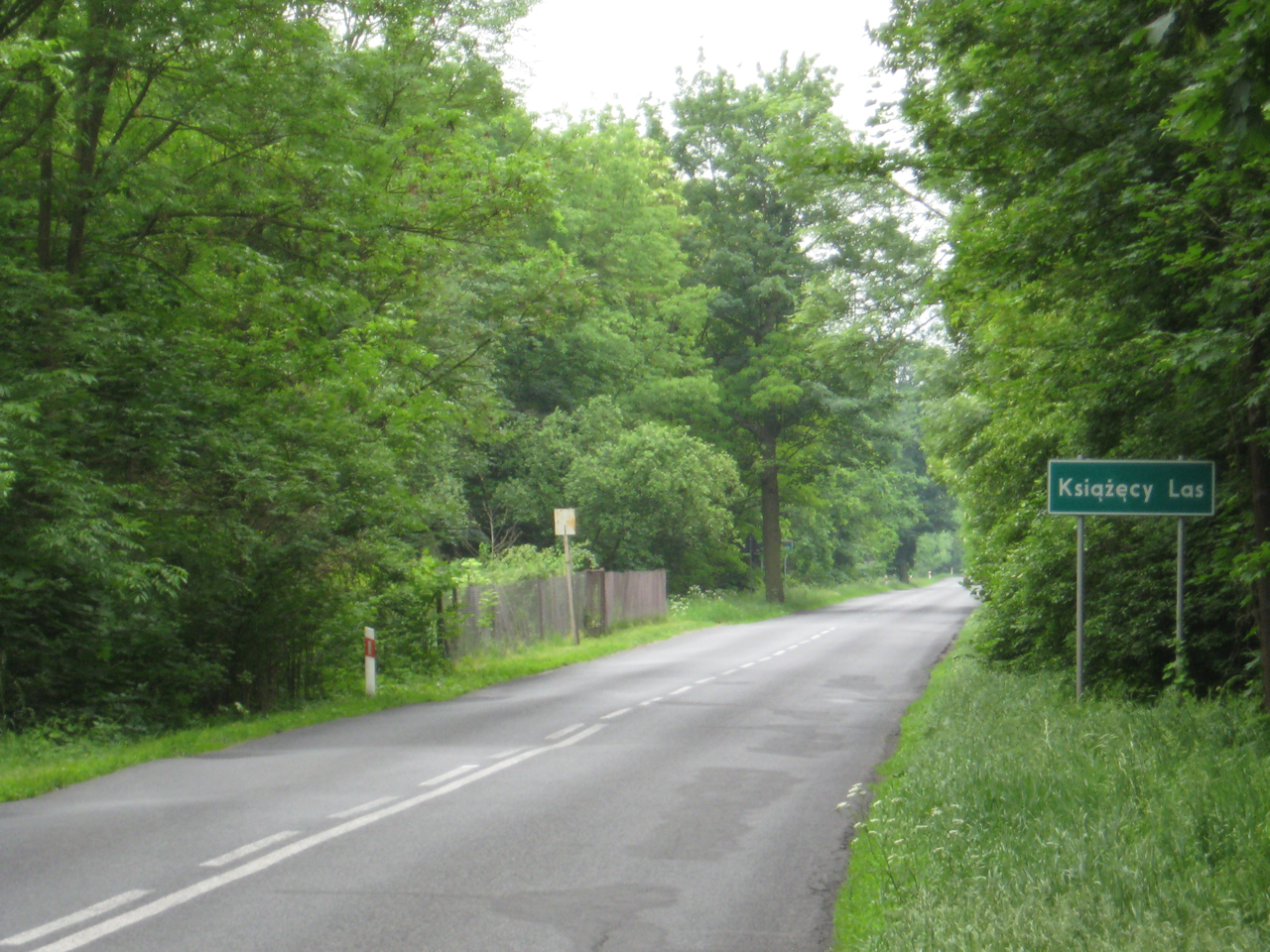
- Road in Książęcy Las

- Location within Poland
- Coordinates: 51°47′27″N 16°33′40″E
- Country: Poland
- Voivodeship: Greater Poland
- County: Leszno
- Gmina: Święciechowa

Książęcy Las [kɕɔ̃ˈʐɛnt͡sɨ ˈlas] is a village in the administrative district of Gmina Święciechowa, within Leszno County, Greater Poland Voivodeship, in west-central Poland.
