= Henrykowo, Leszno County =

Henrykowo
- Village
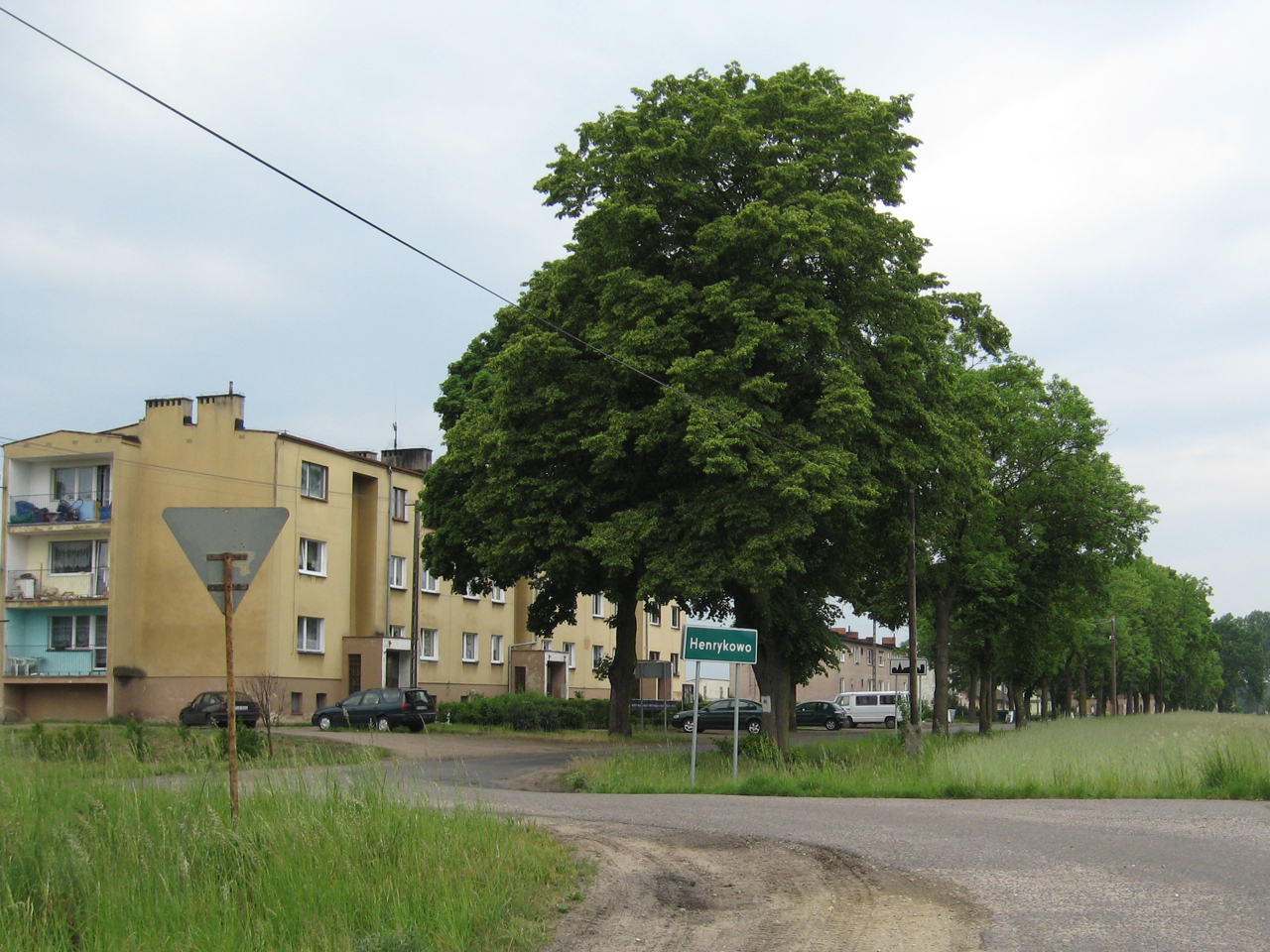

- Location within Poland
- Coordinates: 51°47′18″N 16°32′30″E
- Country: Poland
- Voivodeship: Greater Poland
- County: Leszno
- Gmina: Święciechowa

Henrykowo [xɛnrɨˈkɔvɔ] is a village in the administrative district of Gmina Święciechowa, within Leszno County, Greater Poland Voivodeship, in west-central Poland.
