= Zaborowo, Rawicz County =

Zaborowo
- Village
- Location within Poland
- Coordinates: 51°37′N 17°11′E
- Country: Poland
- Voivodeship: Greater Poland
- County: Rawicz
- Gmina: Jutrosin

Zaborowo ([zabɔˈrɔvɔ]; German: Bismarckseich) is a village in the administrative district of Gmina Jutrosin, within Rawicz County, Greater Poland Voivodeship, in west-central Poland.
