= Długie Stare =

- Village
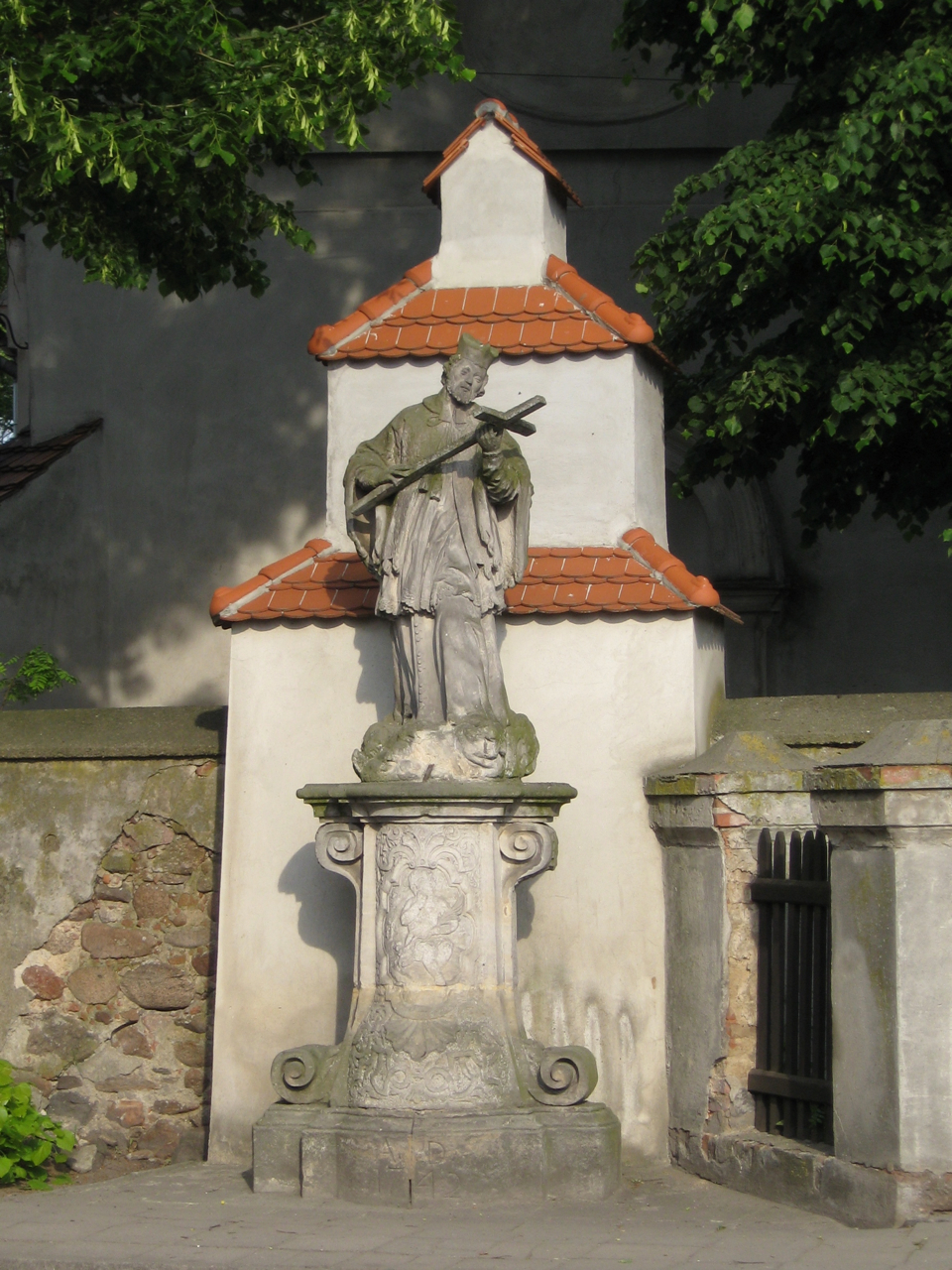

- Location within Poland
- Coordinates: 51°50′N 16°27′E
- Country: Poland
- Voivodeship: Greater Poland
- County: Leszno
- Gmina: Święciechowa
- Population: 810

Długie Stare [ˈdwuɡʲɛ ˈstarɛ] is a village in the administrative district of Gmina Święciechowa, within Leszno County, Greater Poland Voivodeship, in west-central Poland.
