= Kenichi Osada =

Kenichi Osada is an electrical engineer from the Hitachi LTD., Tokyo, Japan, known for his work on static random-access memory. He won an award from the Japan Society for the Promotion of Science in 2013 for his work on reconfigurable analog integrated circuit design. He was named Fellow of the Institute of Electrical and Electronics Engineers (IEEE) in 2016, "for contributions to reliable and low-power nanoscale SRAM".

Osada was born in 1975 in Hyogo Prefecture, Japan and holds a PhD from the Department of Communications and Computer Engineering at Kyoto University.
