= Strzyżewice, Greater Poland Voivodeship =

Strzyżewice
- Village
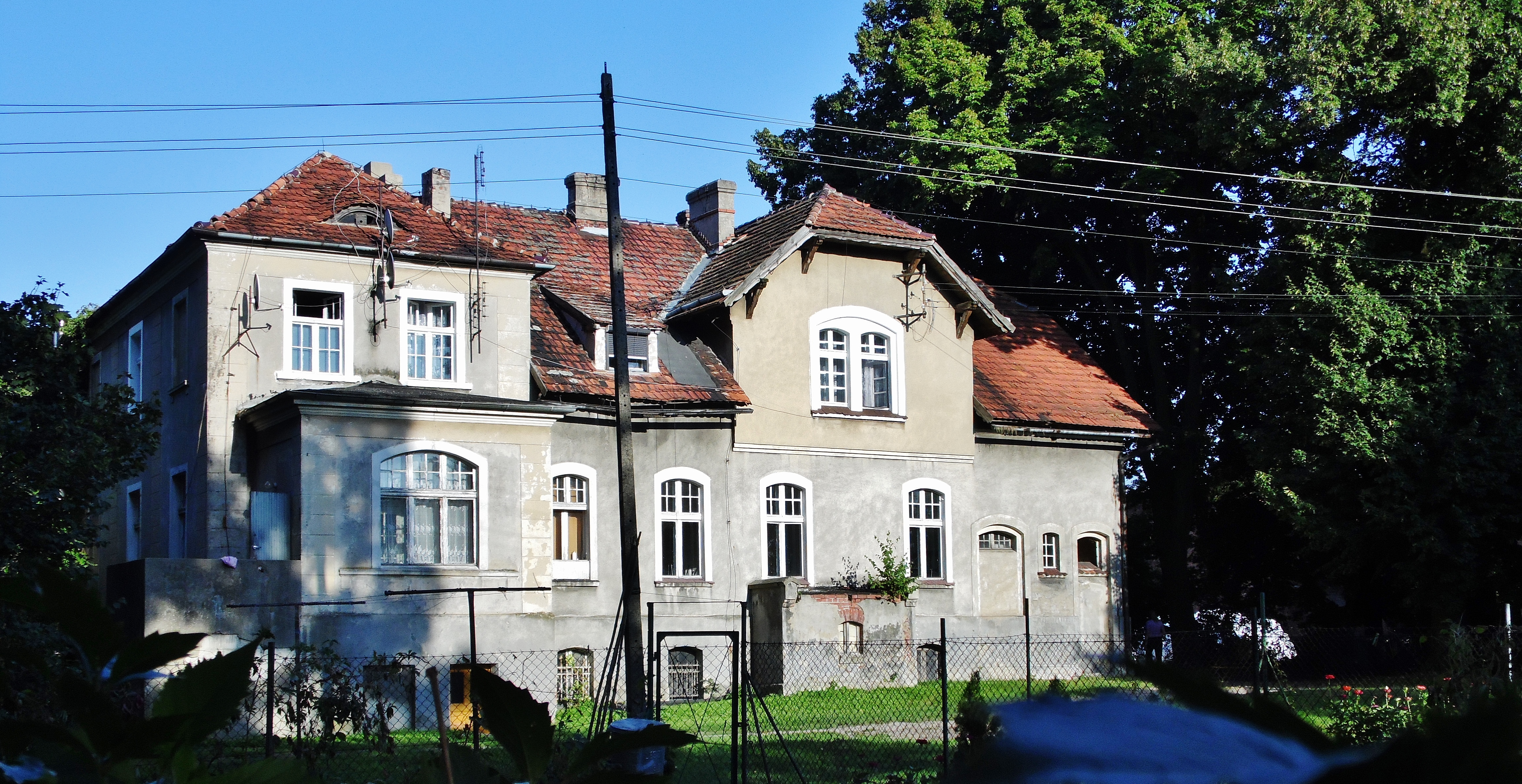
- Former manor house

- Location within Poland
- Coordinates: 51°49′30″N 16°32′22″E
- Country: Poland
- Voivodeship: Greater Poland
- County: Leszno
- Gmina: Święciechowa

Strzyżewice [stʂɨʐɛˈvit͡sɛ] is a village in the administrative district of Gmina Święciechowa, within Leszno County, Greater Poland Voivodeship, in west-central Poland.
