= Święciechowa =

- Village
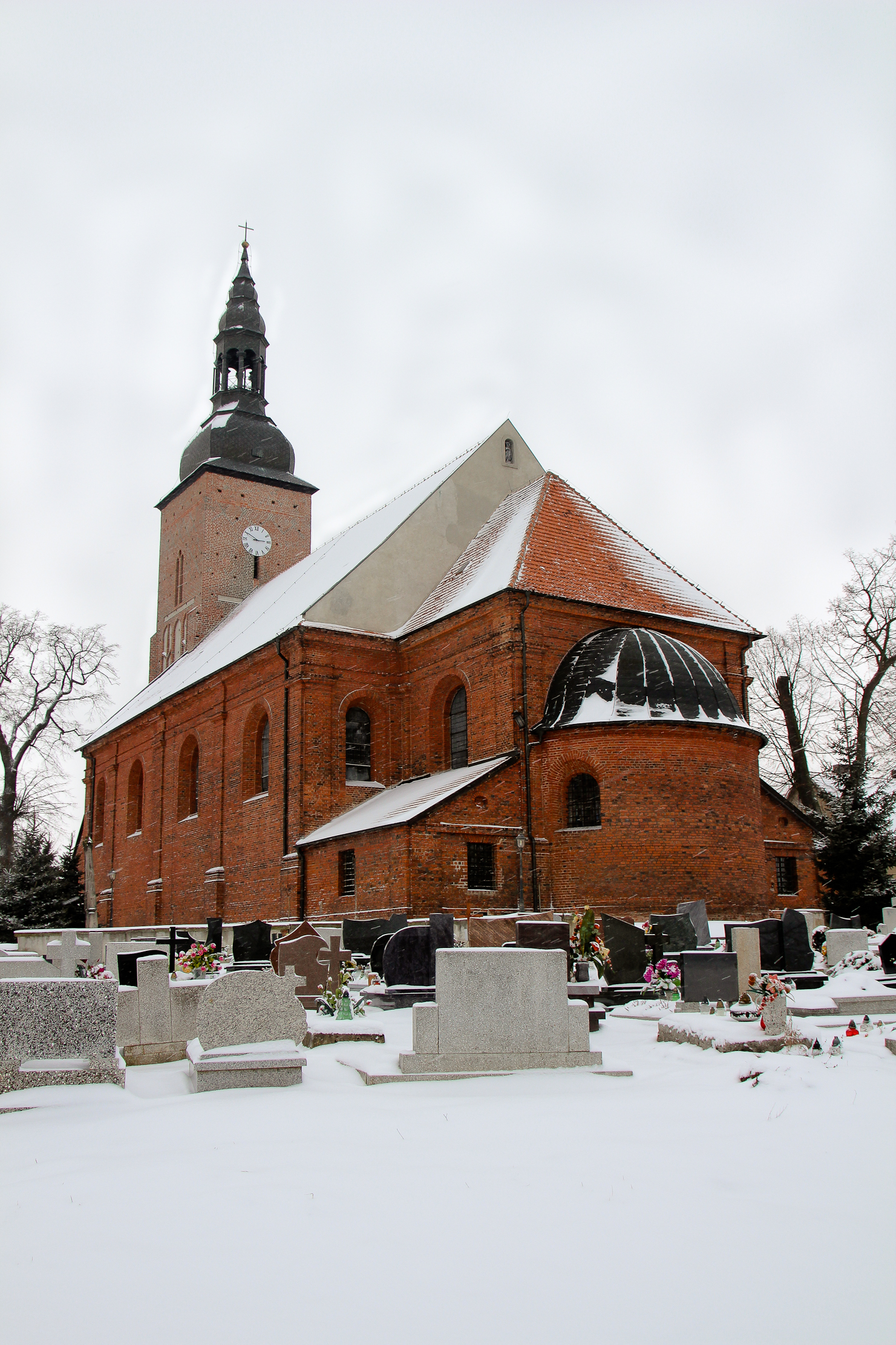
- Saint James church in Święciechowa

- Location within Poland
- Coordinates: 51°51′N 16°30′E
- Country: Poland
- Voivodeship: Greater Poland
- County: Leszno
- Gmina: Święciechowa
- Population: 2,640

Święciechowa (Polish: [ɕfjɛɲt͡ɕɛˈxɔva]) is a village in Leszno County, Greater Poland Voivodeship, in west-central Poland. It is the seat of the gmina (administrative district) called Gmina Święciechowa.

== History ==
During World War II, on 2 September 1939 at around 19:00, the ethnic Germans of Święciechowa carrying Nazi flags were mistaken by Polish soldiers for the Wehrmacht. As a result, a gunfire incident occurred in this village. The Polish forces eventually succeeded in stopping the revolt.

On 4 September 1939, Święciechowa succumbed to German occupation after the retreat of Polish soldiers in the area of Leszno.
