= Kotwicz coat of arms =

Polish coat of arms

Kotwicz
- Alternative names: Ćwieki, Kotłicz, Kottwitz, Kotwic
- Earliest mention: XIII
- Families: Alenkowicz, Bandziński, Bodner, Chmielnik, Ćwieki, Czaplicki, Dłuski, Dzieganowski, Gilewicz, Gilewski, Gilowski, Golicki, Głanicki, Gołaniecki, Gołycki, Gorczyński, Grodlinski, Hajański, Hełmidowski, Hemidowski, Herniczek, Hoitkiewicz, Ibrański, Ippohorski, Ippohorski-Lenkiewicz, Jasiecki, Jasieniecki, Jedlecki, Kalecki, Kalenkowski, Kalęcki, Kalęczyński, Kaliniewicz, Kalęnczyński, Kęsmiński, Kęśmiński, Kolinkiewicz, Komorowski, Korycki, Kotficz, Kotwicki, Kotwicz, Krzycki, Kunikowski, Lengiewicz, Lenkiewicz, Linkiewicz, Mikosza, Mąkoliński, Muchlicki, Muchliński, Muczyński, Olbrotowski, Pochner, Radomicki, Remar, Sasin, Siestrzencowicz, Silheim, Silhen, Smolicki, Smolik, Smulikowski, Strupiński, Strzaliński, Strzała, Swęderski, Sylchanowski, Sylchen, Szczefanowicz, Temric, Tołkacz, Tylkowski, Wężykowski, Wilkowski, Wryszkolski, Wryszkowski, Wyrzykowski, Warpachowski, Zceleraty, Zeceleraty, Zgorski, Zgórski, Zukiński, Żukiński

Kotwicz is a Polish coat of arms. It was used by several szlachta families in the times of the Polish–Lithuanian Commonwealth.

== History ==
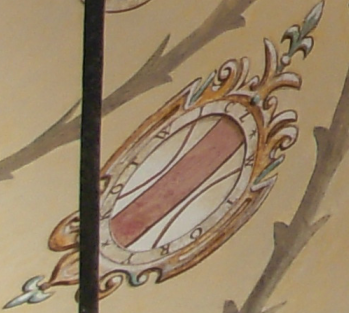
Kotwicz coat of arms in Baranów Sandomierki castle

== Blazon ==
Arms: Argent, fess gules.

== Notable bearers ==
Notable bearers of this coat of arms include: Kotwicz (von Kottwitz), Krzycki

== See also ==
- Polish heraldry
- Heraldry
- Coat of arms
- Armorial of Polish nobility

== Sources ==
- Dynastic Genealogy
- Ornatowski.com
