= Osada Leśna, Greater Poland Voivodeship =

Settlement in Gmina Święciechowa, Poland

Osada Leśna
- Settlement
- Country: Poland
- Voivodeship: Greater Poland
- County: Leszno
- Gmina: Święciechowa

Osada Leśna [ɔˈsada ˈlɛɕna] is a settlement in the administrative district of Gmina Święciechowa, within Leszno County, Greater Poland Voivodeship, in west-central Poland.
