= Edwin Klebs =

German-Swiss microbiologist (1834–1913)

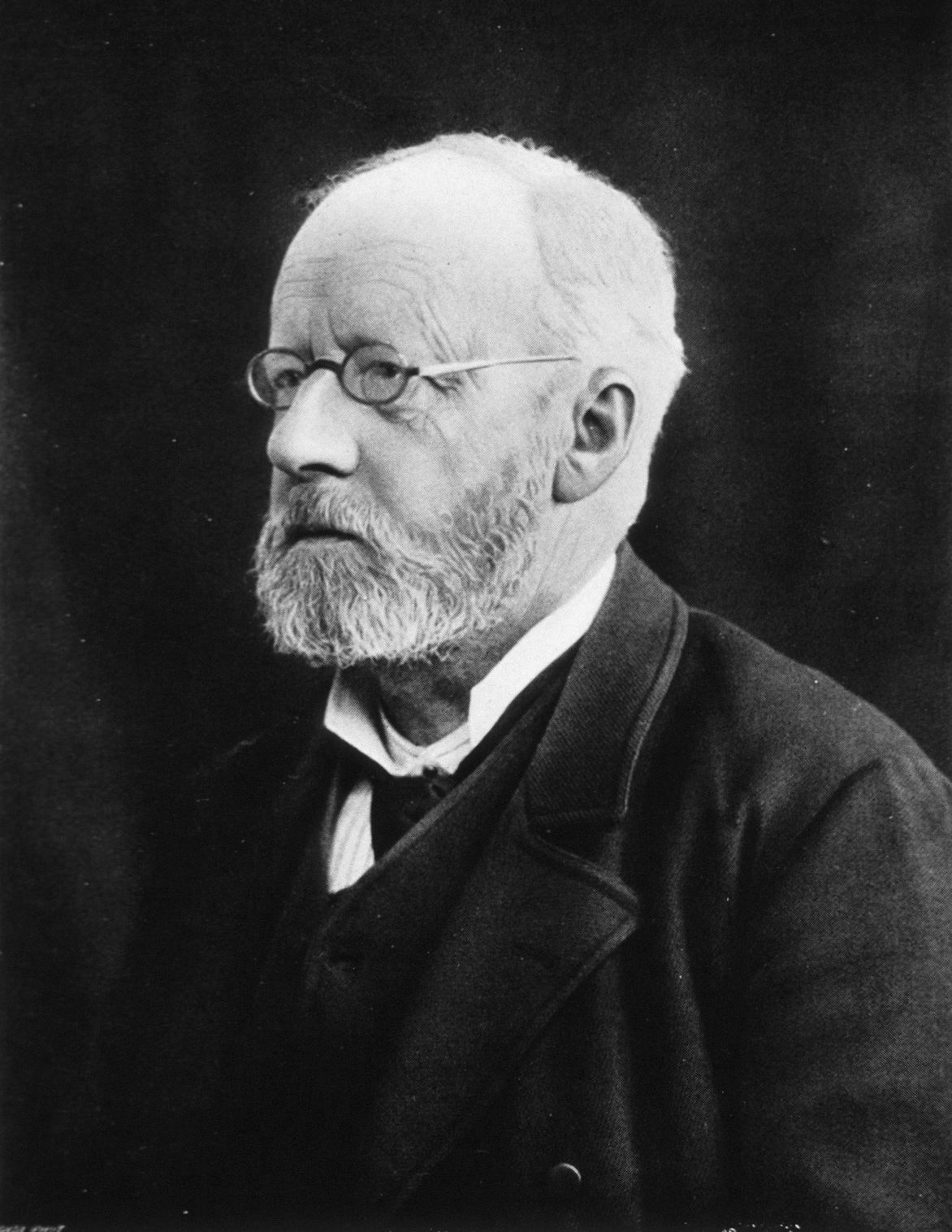
- Theodor Albrecht Edwin Klebs
- Born: 6 February 1834; Königsberg, Kingdom of Prussia
- Died: 23 October 1913 (aged 79); Bern, Switzerland
- Education: University of Würzburg; University of Berlin; University of Königsberg
- Scientific career
- Fields: Pathology
- Workplaces: University of Bern; University of Würzburg; University of Prague; University of Zurich; Rush Medical College
- Doctoral advisor: Rudolf Virchow
- Doctoral students: Otto Lubarsch

Theodor Albrecht Edwin Klebs (6 February 1834 – 23 October 1913) was a German-Swiss microbiologist. He is mainly known for his work on infectious diseases. His works paved the way for the beginning of modern bacteriology, and inspired Louis Pasteur and Robert Koch. He was the first to identify a bacterium that causes diphtheria, which was called Klebs–Loeffler bacterium (now Corynebacterium diphtheriae). He was the father of physician Arnold Klebs.

== Life ==
Klebs was born in Königsberg, Province of Prussia. He studied at the University of Würzburg under Rudolf Virchow in 1855 and received his doctorate at the University of Berlin in 1858. He achieved his habilitation at the University of Königsberg the following year.

Klebs was an assistant to Virchow at the Charité in Berlin from 1861 until 1866, when he became a professor of pathology at the University of Bern in Switzerland. He married Rosa Grossenbacher, a Swiss, and also acquired Swiss citizenship. He served as a military physician for the Prussian Army in 1870 during the Franco-Prussian War; several of his ancestors had fought during the Napoleonic Wars.

Klebs taught at Würzburg from 1872 to 1873, at Prague from 1873 to 1882, and at Zürich from 1882 to 1892. Because of disagreements with the rest of the faculty, the impetuous Klebs resigned from Zürich in 1893 and ran an unsuccessful private business in Karlsruhe and Strassburg in 1894.

From 1896 to 1900, Klebs taught at Rush Medical College in Chicago, United States. From 1905 to 1910, he was a private researcher in Berlin, after which he returned to Switzerland, living with his oldest son in Lausanne. Klebs died in Bern.

== Discoveries ==
In 1883, Klebs successfully identified the bacterium Corynebacterium diphtheriae as the etiological agent of diphtheria. This bacterium is also known as the Klebs-Löffler bacillus.

The bacterial genus Klebsiella is named in honor of his work. Also Klebsormidium, which is a genus of filamentous charophyte green algae comprising 20 species, was also named in his honour in 1972.

Klebs' works preceded some of the most important discoveries in medicine. He described acromegaly in 1884, two years before Pierre Marie. In 1878, he successfully inoculated syphilis in monkeys, antedating Élie Metchnikoff and Émile Roux by 25 years. He isolated colonies of bacteria nine years before Robert Koch. He was the first to produce tuberculosis experimentally in animals by the injection of milk from infected cows. He identified the typhoid bacillus (now named Salmonella typhi) before Karl Joseph Eberth.

=== Fundamental tests in bacteriology ===
Klebs identified four "Grundversuche" (fundamental tests) that provided a basis for his research strategy, as well as general bacteriological research. According to Klebs, the bacteriological tests consist of the following postulates:

- First, all bacteria are pathological.
- Second, bacteria never occur spontaneously.
- Third, every disease is caused only by bacteria.
- Fourth, the bacteria that cause distinguishable disease are distinguishable.

Although some of these hypotheses are literally false, they are in general the foundation of modern experiments in bacteriology.

== Scientific blunders ==
Klebs made some significant errors about infectious diseases. He believed, for example, that malaria was caused by a bacterium. In 1879, Corrado Tommasi-Crudeli and claimed that they isolated a bacterium from the waters of Pontine Marshes in Roman Campagna. They concluded that the bacterium was the pathogen for malaria as they discovered it from damp soil in the region of malaria epidemics. They gave it the name Bacillus malariae. They further experimented with the bacterial isolate which they injected into rabbits. They observed that infected rabbits developed fever and enlarged spleen, characteristics of malaria. They proposed that the malarial bacterium was transmitted by drinking contaminated water or inhalation from the air. Klebs reported that the antimalarial drug quinine killed the germ. The discovery was supported by leading malariologists of the time. It was then declared that the malaria problem was solved. When a French Army physician Charles Alphonse Laveran correctly discovered in 1880 that malaria was caused by a protozoan parasite (which he called Oscillaria malariae, now Plasmodium falciparum), the discovery was ignored in preference of the bacillus theory of Klebs and Tommasi-Crudeli. An American physician, though, George Miller Sternberg, proved that the bacillus did not cause specific symptoms of malaria in 1881. The bacillus theory was eventually proved wrong by the experimental demonstration of the mosquito-malaria theory in 1898.

Klebs also made mistakes in claiming the existence of Microzoon septicum as causative agent of wound infection, and "monadines" as the pathogen for rheumatism.
