= Battle of Poniec =

1704 battle in the Great Northern War

Coordinates: 51.7583°N 16.8167°E

- Part of the Great Northern War
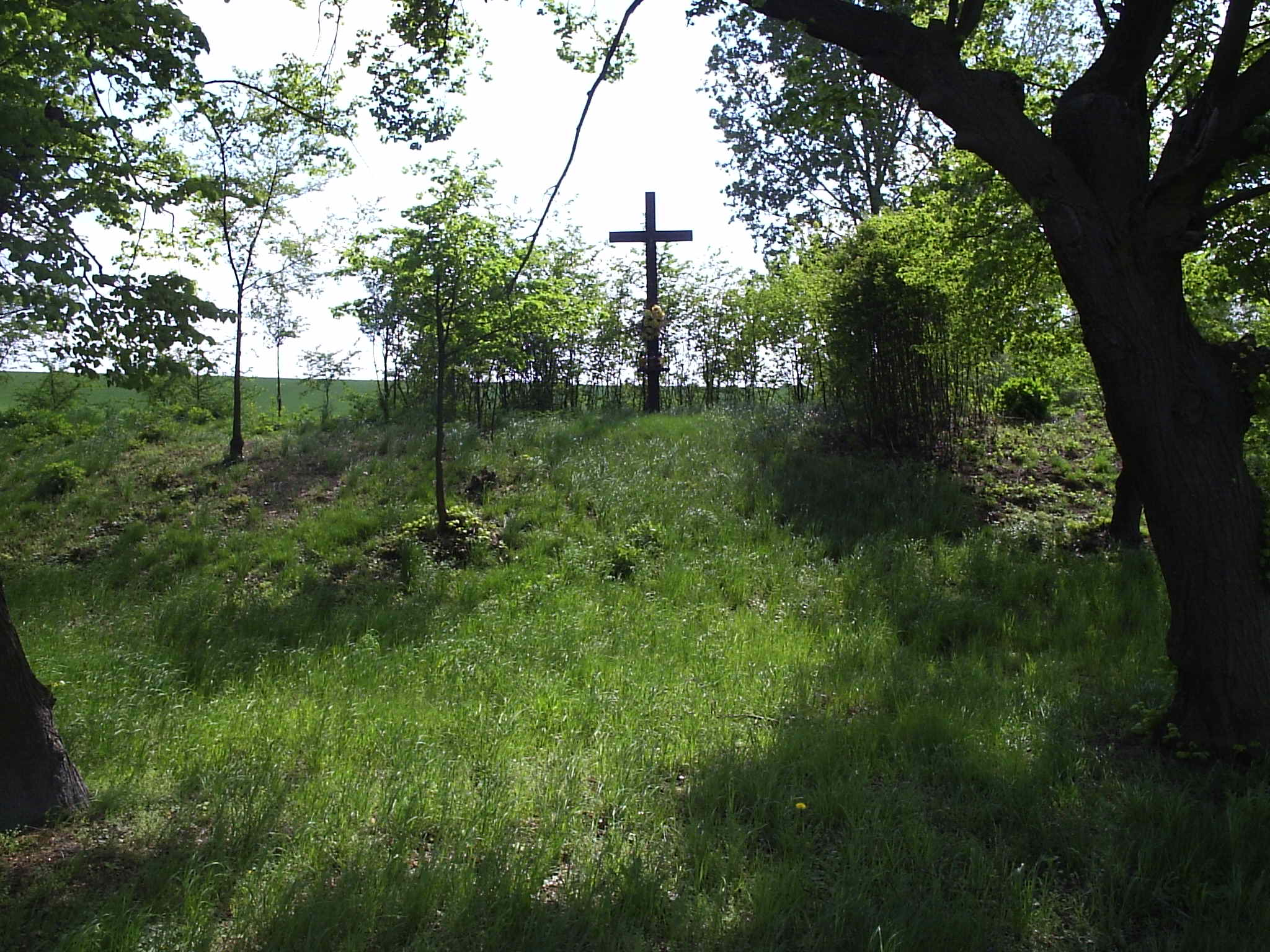
- Memorial to fallen Swedish soldiers near Poniec
Date	27 October 1704 (O.S.); 28 October 1704 (Swedish); 7 November 1704 (N.S.)
Location	Poniec, Polish–Lithuanian Commonwealth
Result	Swedish victory

Belligerents
(yes) Swedish Empire	Saxony

Commanders and leaders
Charles XII	Johann Matthias von der Schulenburg

Strength
2,700–5,600	5,500–6,000

Casualties and losses
550–650	700–800

The Battle of Poniec took place on 7 November 1704 (N.S.) at Poniec, in the Polish–Lithuanian Commonwealth, during the Great Northern War. With a force of cavalry and dragoons, Charles XII of Sweden successfully dislodged the Saxon Army under Johann Matthias von der Schulenburg from Poniec. To fend off the Swedish pursuit, Schulenburg formed a massive square formation at Moraczewo. Having failed to break it, Charles XII called off the attacks at the approach of night. This allowed Schulenburg to escape into neutral Silesia. With Greater Poland cleared of Saxon troops, the Swedes shattered their Cossack and Russian allies at Bełcz Wielki and Tillendorf (near Wschowa).

== Background ==
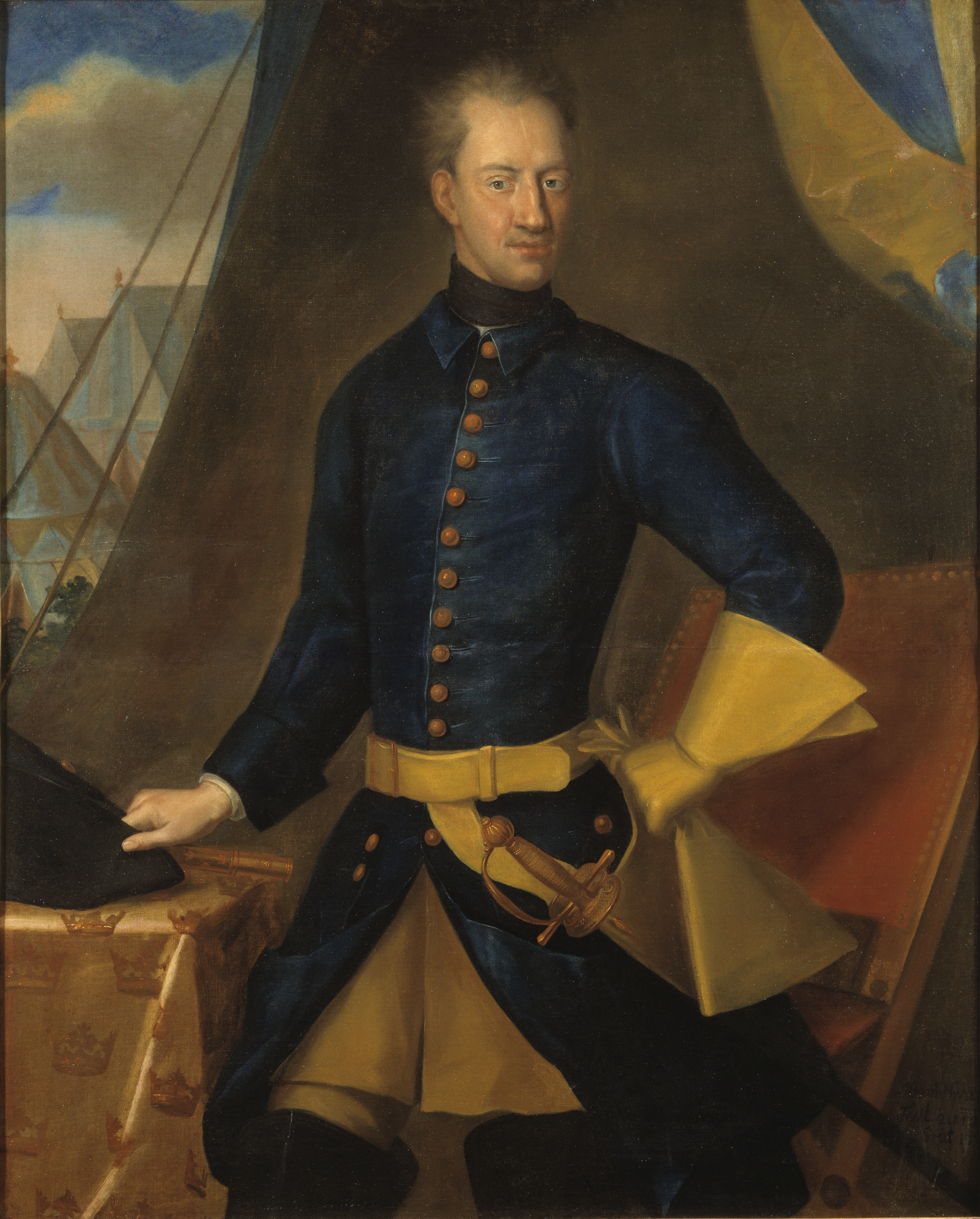
King Charles XII, commanding the Swedish forces

In August 1704, Charles XII of Sweden marched to Lviv, in the Polish–Lithuanian Commonwealth, which was taken by storm the following month. Augustus II the Strong, who camped in Sandomierz, took advantage of this by capturing Warsaw. When Charles XII marched for the Polish capital in October, Augustus II commenced a retreat to Kraków, ordering Johann Matthias von der Schulenburg to lift the siege of Posen and follow suit. Schulenburg tried to cross the river Oder and flee to Saxony with 4,500–5,000 infantry and 1,000 cavalry, followed by Charles XII with 5,600 cavalry and dragoons. Schulenburg made a stand at the city of Poniec, whilst awaiting 3,600 Russians and Cossacks.

== Battle ==
As Charles XII arrived in the vicinity on 7 November, he only had one cavalry and three dragoon regiments at his disposal, or 2,700 men; five additional regiments would arrive progressively to the battle, or could not reach it in time. Schulenberg mobilized his twelve infantry battalions, nine cannons and four cavalry squadrons between the Polski River and the village of Janiszewo, west of Poniec; the left flank was protected by rough marshes and the right was anchored to Janiszewo. His cavalry were deployed on the wings and the infantry made up the centre, covered by cheval de frise.

Despite their numerical inferiority, the Swedes charged home in full gallop around 4 pm and chased away Schulenburg's cavalry on both flanks. This exposed the left flank of his infantry, causing the two battalions furthest out to give way. As the Swedes were on the verge of attacking his rear, Schulenburg, having suffered a wound in the action, ordered a retreat shortly after 5 pm, leaving behind a cannon. One or two battalions, of whom many men were captured, acted as a rearguard to cover his withdrawal. To fend off the Swedish pursuit, Schulenburg formed a giant square formation at Moraczewo – 1,000 metres long on each side – covered by a long ditch and dense marshes.

With additional reinforcements, Charles XII launched several mounted attacks to break the formation, all of which were repulsed by concentrated volleys of muskets and cannons; the few times his troops managed to penetrate the Saxon lines, they were quickly cut down inside the square. With mounting losses, and a fog developing in the full night, Charles XII disengaged his forces at 7 pm. He pulled back to Poniec, planning to renew the fight the next day as more reinforcements arrived. This allowed the Saxons to continue the retreat. When realizing this, Charles XII once again took up pursuit.

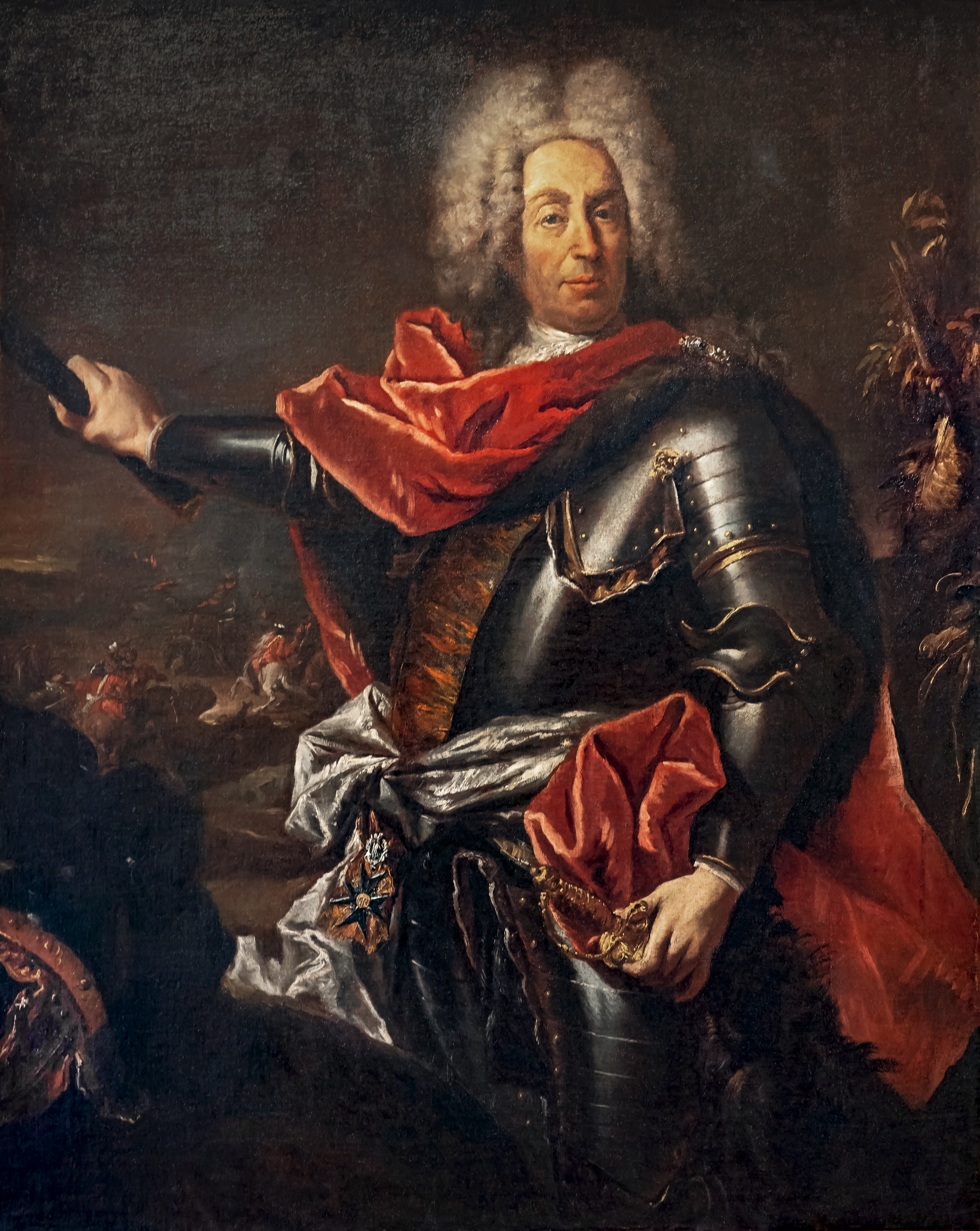
General Schulenburg, commanding the Saxon forces

== Aftermath ==
Charles XII admitted to a loss of 289 men killed and wounded, while Defoe mentions 400–500 Swedish losses in his biography about the king. According to Polish historian Zbigniew Anusik, the Swedes lost as many as 1,500 men. Schulenburg admitted to a loss of 489 Saxons, also losing most of his guns. Damian Plowy, on the other hand, estimates a total loss of 550–650 Swedes, and 500–600 killed or wounded and 200 captured Saxons.

Charles XII pursued Schulenburg to the Oder river and neutral Silesia, where the Saxon commander reached safety. Greater Poland had thus been completely cleared of Saxon troops. Charles XII could then turn his attention towards the Cossacks and Russians who had marched to rendezvous with Schulenburg at Poniec, annihilating parts of their forces at the Battle of Oderbeltsch (Bełcz Wielki) and the Battle of Tillendorf respectively.

The battle resulted in a Swedish victory.
