= Miastko, Greater Poland Voivodeship =

Miastko
- Village
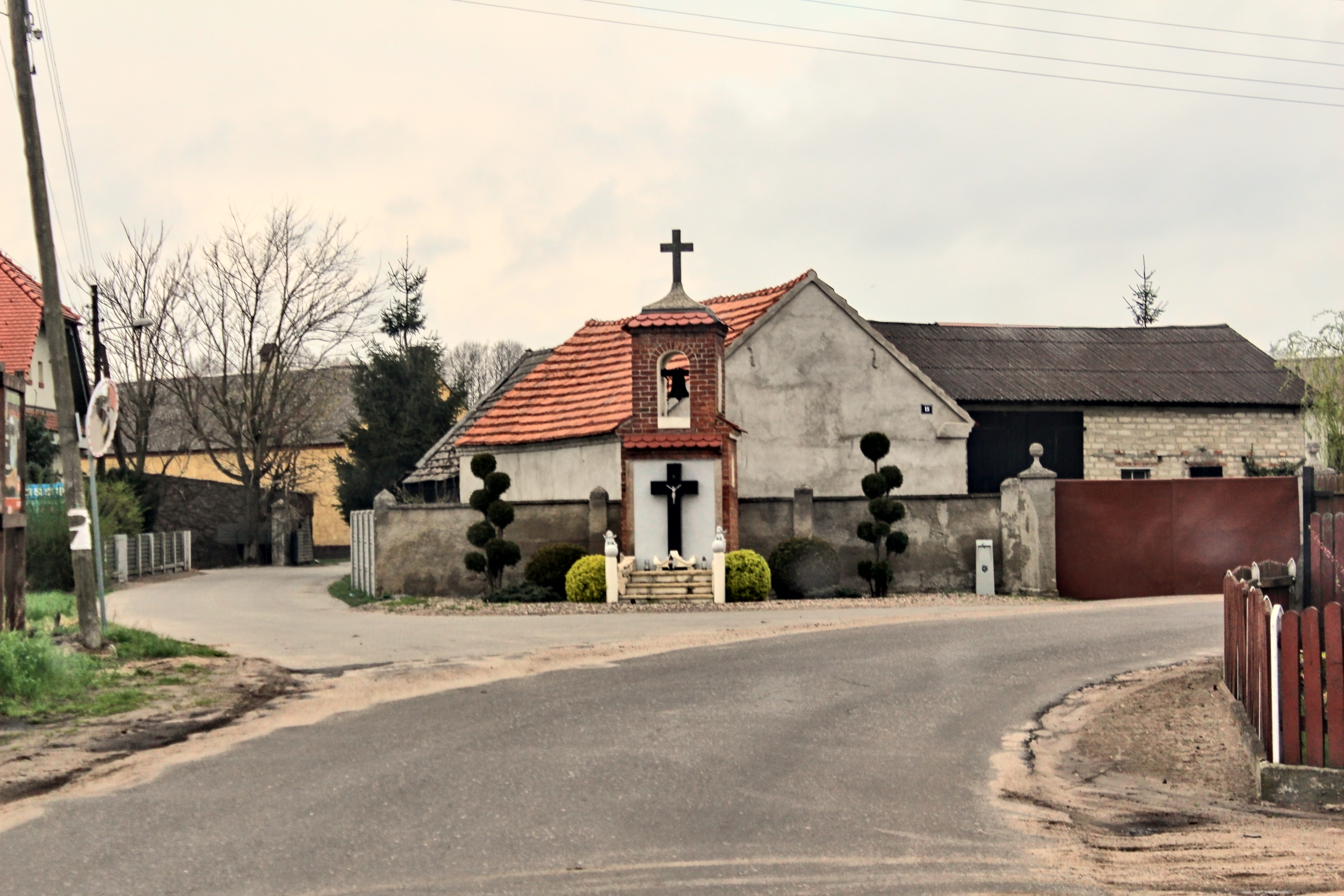
- Miastko, Gmina Wijewo

- Location within Poland
- Coordinates: 51°55′56″N 16°15′23″E
- Country: Poland
- Voivodeship: Greater Poland
- County: Leszno
- Gmina: Wijewo

Miastko [ˈmjastkɔ] is a village in the administrative district of Gmina Wijewo, within Leszno County, Greater Poland Voivodeship, in west-central Poland.
