= Przylesie =

Przylesie may refer to the following places:

- Przylesie, Greater Poland Voivodeship (west-central Poland)
- Przylesie, Opole Voivodeship (south-west Poland)
- Przylesie, Pomeranian Voivodeship (north Poland)
- Przylesie, Warmian-Masurian Voivodeship (north Poland)
