= Rojęczyn =

- Village
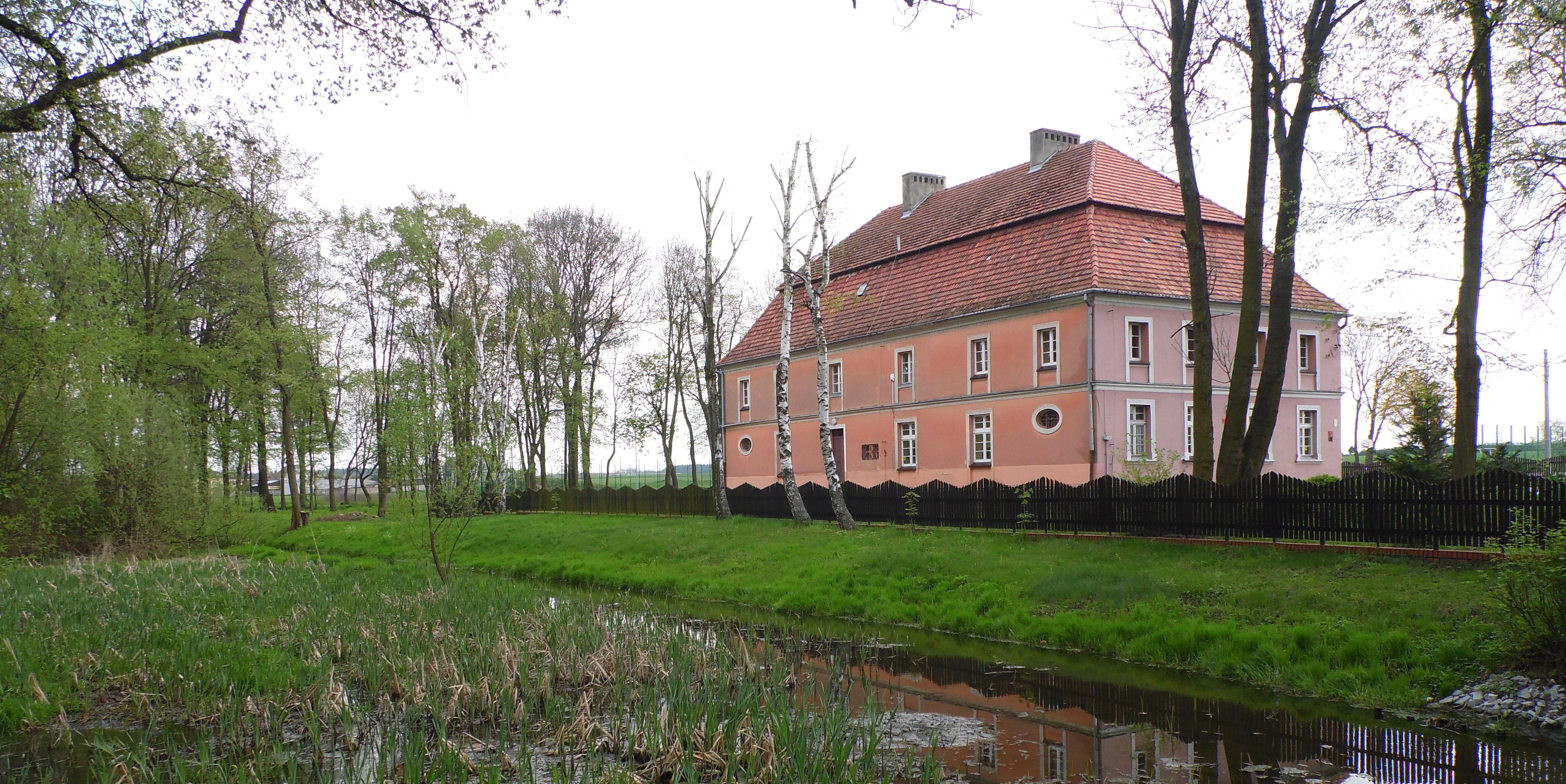
- Manor in the village

- Location within Poland
- Coordinates: 51°44′N 16°41′E
- Country: Poland
- Voivodeship: Greater Poland
- County: Leszno
- Gmina: Rydzyna

Rojęczyn [rɔˈjɛnt͡ʂɨn] is a village in the administrative district of Gmina Rydzyna, within Leszno County, Greater Poland Voivodeship, in west-central Poland.
