= Koronowo (disambiguation) =

Koronowo may refer to the following places:

- Koronowo, Greater Poland Voivodeship (west-central Poland)
- Koronowo in Kuyavian-Pomeranian Voivodeship (north-central Poland)
- Koronowo, Warmian-Masurian Voivodeship (north Poland)
