= Janówko =

Janówko may refer to the following places:

- Janówko, Greater Poland Voivodeship (west-central Poland)
- Janówko, Kuyavian-Pomeranian Voivodeship (north-central Poland)
- Janówko, Warmian-Masurian Voivodeship (north Poland)
