= Zbarzyk =

- Settlement
- Location within Poland
- Coordinates: 51°52′7″N 16°21′6″E
- Country: Poland
- Voivodeship: Greater Poland
- County: Leszno
- Gmina: Włoszakowice

Zbarzyk [ˈzbaʐɨk] is a settlement in the administrative district of Gmina Włoszakowice, within Leszno County, Greater Poland Voivodeship, in west-central Poland.
