= Daćbogi, Greater Poland Voivodeship =

Settlement in Greater Poland, Poland

Daćbogi
- Settlement
- Location within Poland
- Coordinates: 51°52′24″N 16°20′39″E
- Country: Poland
- Voivodeship: Greater Poland
- County: Leszno
- Gmina: Włoszakowice

Daćbogi [dat͡ɕˈbɔɡi] is a settlement in the administrative district of Gmina Włoszakowice, within Leszno County, Greater Poland Voivodeship, in west-central Poland.
