= Smyczyna =

- Village
- Location within Poland
- Coordinates: 51°56′N 16°31′E
- Country: Poland
- Voivodeship: Greater Poland
- County: Leszno
- Gmina: Lipno

Smyczyna [smɨˈt͡ʂɨna] is a village in the administrative district of Gmina Lipno, within Leszno County, Greater Poland Voivodeship, in west-central Poland.
