= Krzycko Wielkie =

- Village
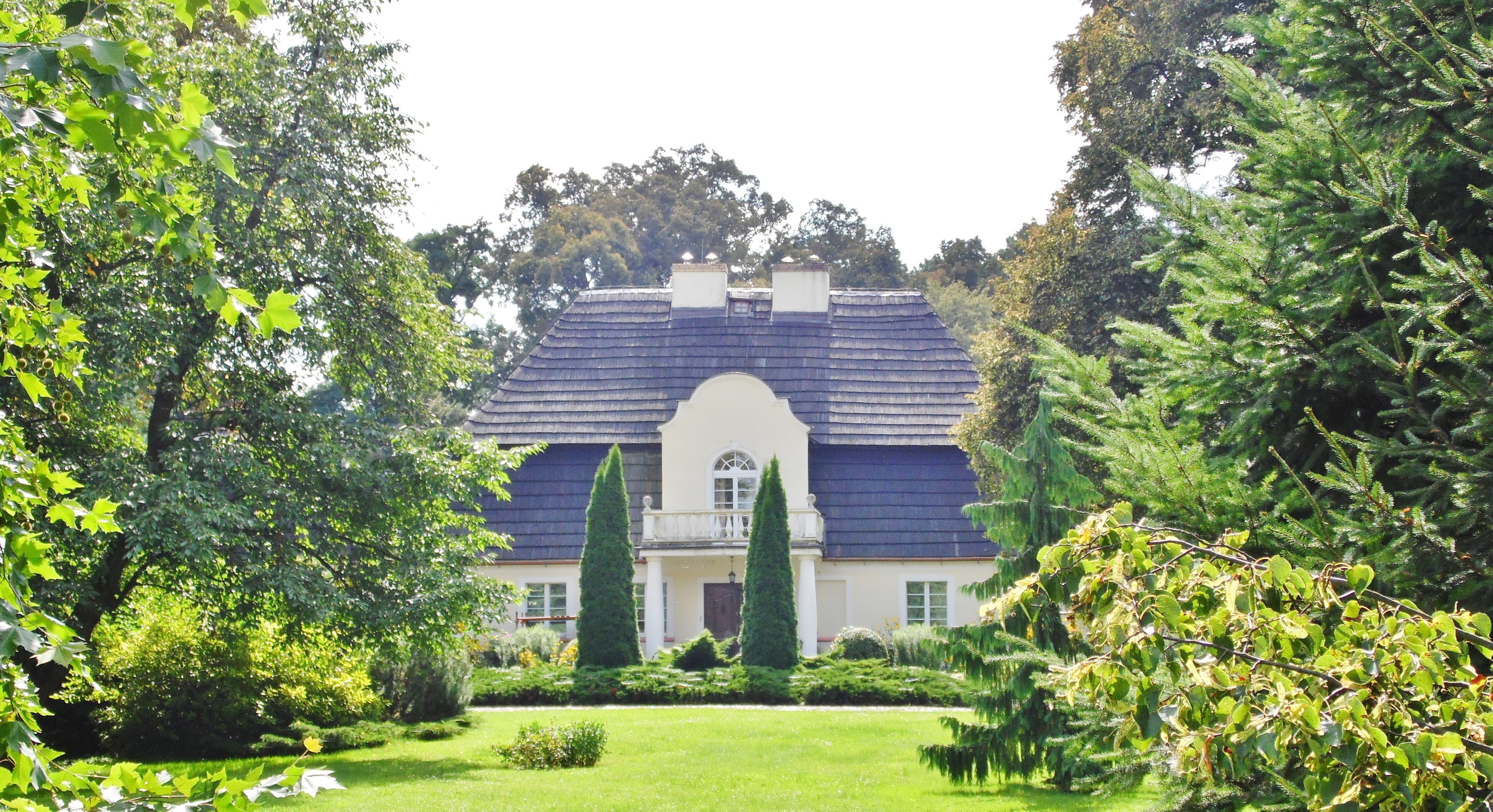
- Manor in the village

- Location within Poland
- Coordinates: 51°54′33″N 16°27′7″E
- Country: Poland
- Voivodeship: Greater Poland
- County: Leszno
- Gmina: Włoszakowice

Population
  - Total: 690

Krzycko Wielkie [ˈkʂɨt͡skɔ ˈvjɛlkʲɛ] is a village in the administrative district of Gmina Włoszakowice, within Leszno County, Greater Poland Voivodeship, in west-central Poland.
