= Nowy Świat, Leszno County =

Nowy Świat
- Village
- Location within Poland
- Coordinates: 51°50′34″N 16°38′20″E
- Country: Poland
- Voivodeship: Greater Poland
- County: Leszno
- Gmina: Rydzyna

Nowy Świat (Polish pronunciation: [ˈnɔvɨ ˈɕfjat]) is a village in the administrative district of Gmina Rydzyna, within Leszno County, Greater Poland Voivodeship, in west-central Poland.
