= Osieczna Castle =

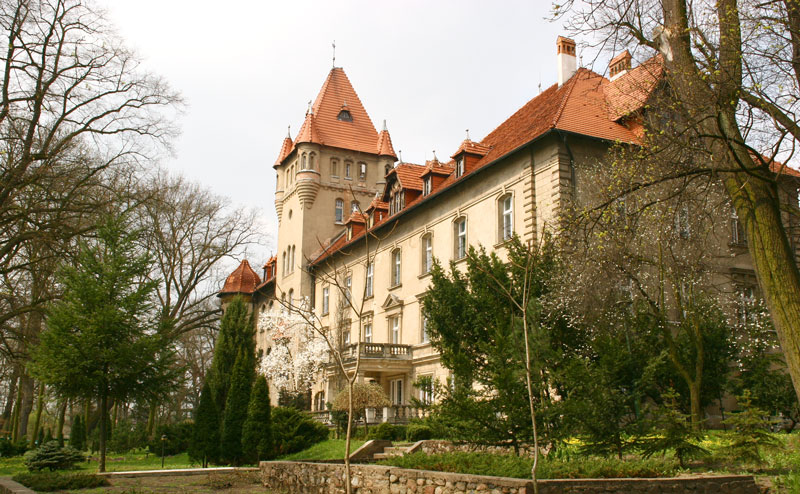
- Osieczna Castle

- Location of the Osieczna Castle in Poland
- 51°54′06″N 16°40′25″E
- Location: Osieczna, Greater Poland Voivodeship, in Poland

History
- Built: 1890-1908

Site notes
- Architectural style: Renaissance Revival

Osieczna Castle - built between 1890 and 1908, a Renaissance Revival castle located in Osieczna, Greater Poland Voivodeship in Poland.

The first stronghold was built in this place probably in the 14th century for the castellan of Santok, Wojsław Borek from Gryżyna (d. 1373) or around the middle of the 15th century in the time of his successor, Maciej Borek from Nowe Miasto nad Wartą and Lipno (1418-1452). The castle had the shape of a quadrangle with the western and northern wings preserved to this day on the ground floor.

In 1512, Łukasz II Górka bought castle. In 1592 the castle inherited castellan Andrzej Czarnkowski, who expanded it around 1601. Reconstruction in the eclectic style was made in the years 1890-1908. The castle also housed the chess library of Tassilo von Heydebrand und der Lasa, who lived there in the last year of his life.
