= Boszkowo-Letnisko =

- Village
- Location within Poland
- Coordinates: 51°57′28″N 16°20′6″E
- Country: Poland
- Voivodeship: Greater Poland
- County: Leszno
- Gmina: Włoszakowice

Boszkowo-Letnisko [bɔʂˈkɔvɔ lɛtˈniskɔ] is a village in the administrative district of Gmina Włoszakowice, within Leszno County, Greater Poland Voivodeship, in west-central Poland.
