= Dłużyna, Greater Poland Voivodeship =

Dłużyna
- Village
- Location within Poland
- Coordinates: 51°58′9″N 16°22′28″E
- Country: Poland
- Voivodeship: Greater Poland
- County: Leszno
- Gmina: Włoszakowice
- Population: 465
- Website: http://www.dluzyna.pl/

Dłużyna ([dwuˈʐɨna]) is a village in the administrative district of Gmina Włoszakowice, within Leszno County, Greater Poland Voivodeship, in west-central Poland.

== Notable people ==
- Władysław Śleboda (1925–2009), a Polish politician, mayor of Poznań
