= Ratowice =

Ratowice may refer to the following places in Poland:

- Ratowice, Lower Silesian Voivodeship (south-west Poland)
- Ratowice, Greater Poland Voivodeship (west-central Poland)
