= Dąbcze =

- Village
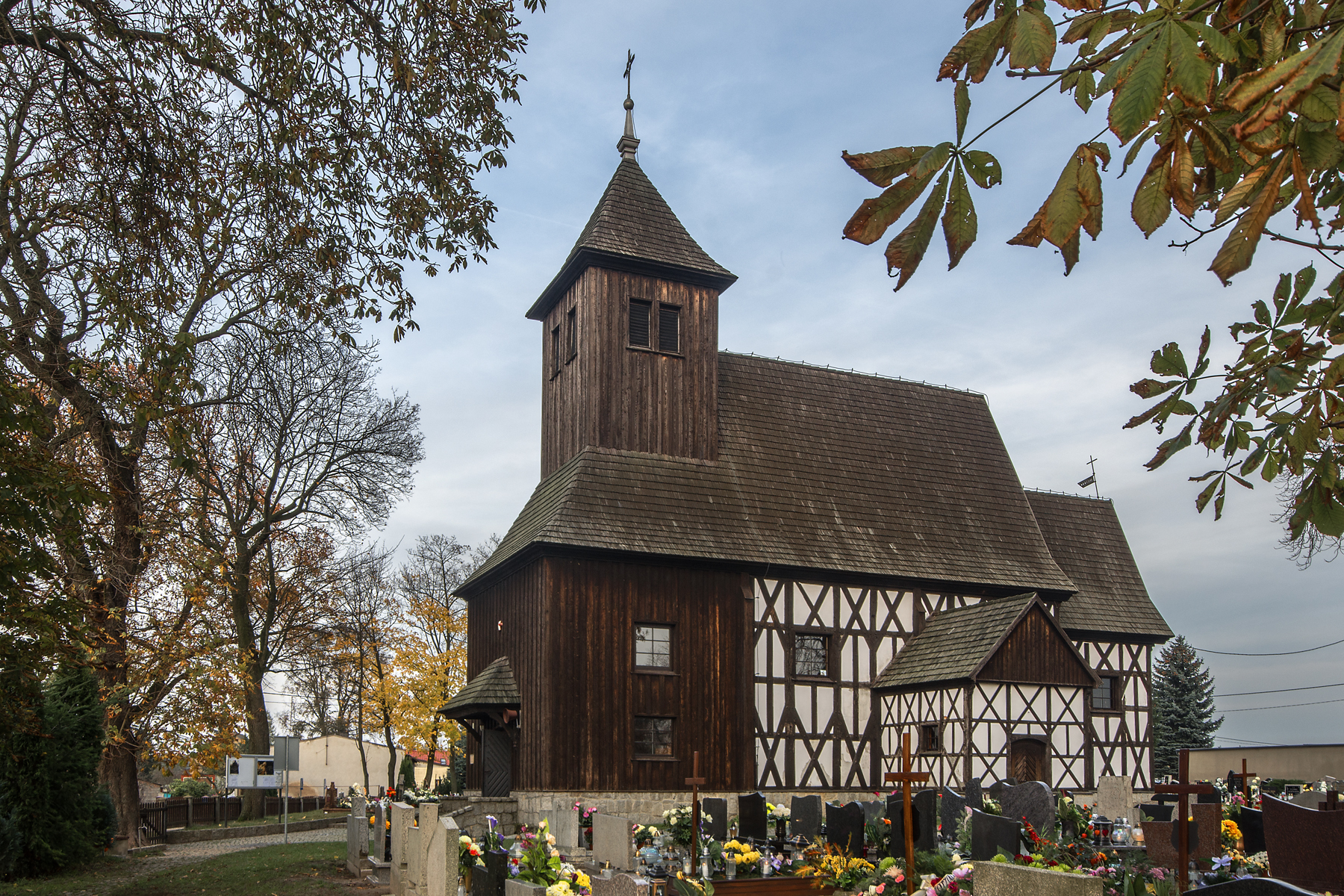
- St. Catherine's Church and cemetery

- Location within Poland
- Coordinates: 51°50′N 16°39′E
- Country: Poland
- Voivodeship: Greater Poland
- County: Leszno
- Gmina: Rydzyna
- Population: 1,000

Dąbcze [ˈdɔmpt͡ʂɛ] is a village in the administrative district of Gmina Rydzyna, within Leszno County, Greater Poland Voivodeship, in west-central Poland.
