= Jezierzyce Kościelne =

- Village
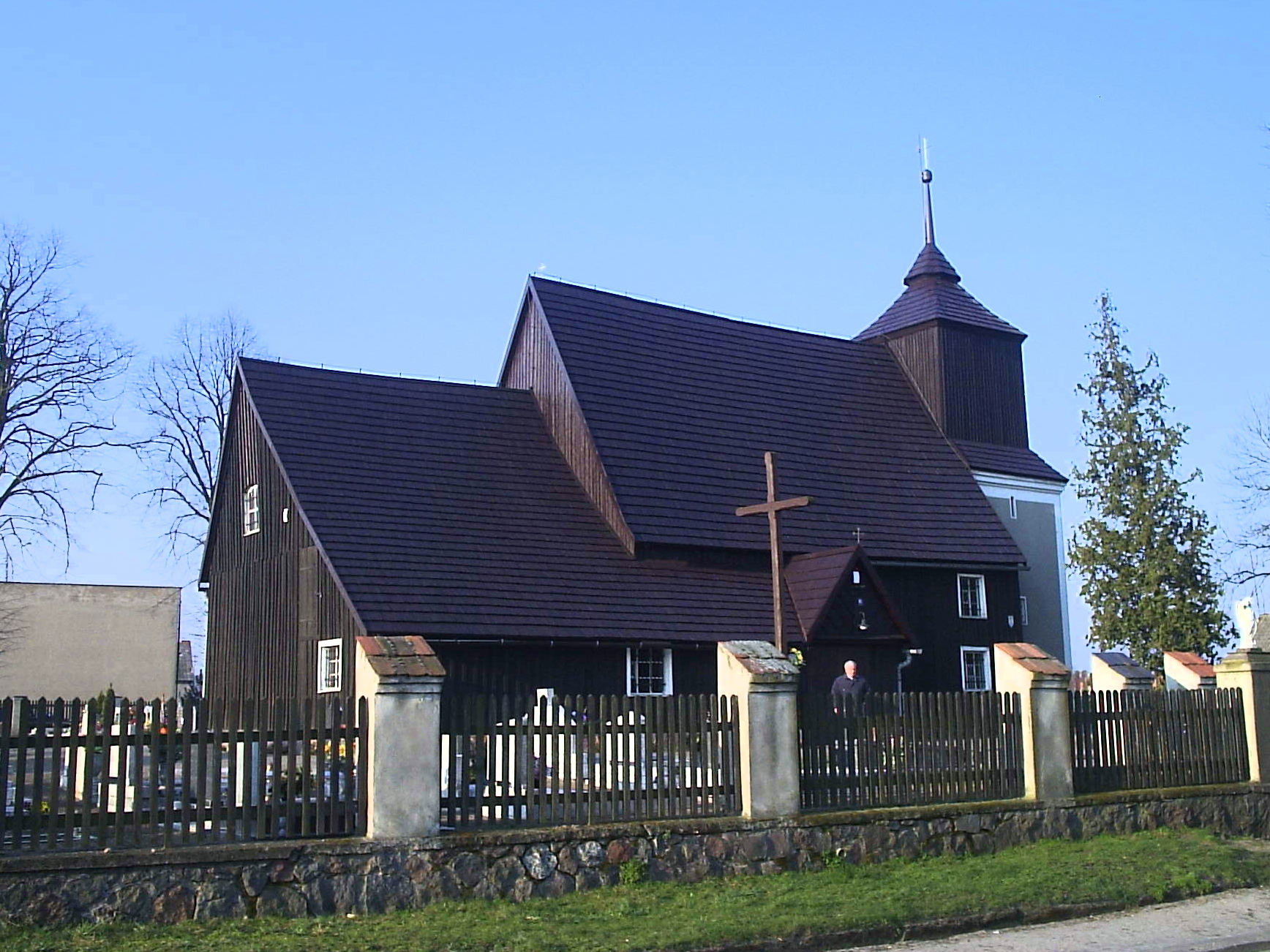
- Church of Saint Michael Archangel

- Location within Poland
- Coordinates: 51°53′23″N 16°24′40″E
- Country: Poland
- Voivodeship: Greater Poland
- County: Leszno
- Gmina: Włoszakowice

Population
  - Total: 480

Jezierzyce Kościelne [jɛʑɛˈʐɨt͡sɛ kɔɕˈt͡ɕɛlnɛ] is a village in the administrative district of Gmina Włoszakowice, within Leszno County, Greater Poland Voivodeship, in west-central Poland.
