= Piorunowo =

- Settlement
- Location within Poland
- Coordinates: 51°54′22″N 16°27′53″E
- Country: Poland
- Voivodeship: Greater Poland
- County: Leszno
- Gmina: Włoszakowice

Piorunowo [pjɔruˈnɔvɔ] is a settlement in the administrative district of Gmina Włoszakowice, within Leszno County, Greater Poland Voivodeship, in west-central Poland.
