= Zaborówiec =

- Village
- Location within Poland
- Coordinates: 51°54′N 16°16′E
- Country: Poland
- Voivodeship: Greater Poland
- County: Leszno
- Gmina: Wijewo
- Population: 270

Zaborówiec [zabɔˈruvjɛt͡s] is a village in the administrative district of Gmina Wijewo, within Leszno County, Greater Poland Voivodeship, in west-central Poland.
