= Koczury =

- Village
- Location within Poland
- Coordinates: 51°54′32″N 16°23′15″E
- Country: Poland
- Voivodeship: Greater Poland
- County: Leszno
- Gmina: Włoszakowice

Koczury [kɔˈt͡ʂurɨ] is a village in the administrative district of Gmina Włoszakowice, within Leszno County, Greater Poland Voivodeship, in west-central Poland.
