= Goniembice =

- Village
- Location within Poland
- Coordinates: 51°54′50″N 16°36′58″E
- Country: Poland
- Voivodeship: Greater Poland
- County: Leszno
- Gmina: Lipno
- Population: 210

Goniembice [ɡɔɲɛmˈbit͡sɛ] is a village in the administrative district of Gmina Lipno, within Leszno County, Greater Poland Voivodeship, in west-central Poland.
