= Radomyśl, Greater Poland Voivodeship =

Radomyśl
- Village
- Location within Poland
- Coordinates: 51°54′N 16°11′E
- Country: Poland
- Voivodeship: Greater Poland
- County: Leszno
- Gmina: Wijewo

Radomyśl [raˈdɔmɨɕl] is a village in the administrative district of Gmina Wijewo, within Leszno County, Greater Poland Voivodeship, in west-central Poland.
