= Adamowo, Gmina Włoszakowice =

Adamowo
- Settlement
- Location within Poland
- Coordinates: 51°54′31″N 16°26′15″E
- Country: Poland
- Voivodeship: Greater Poland
- County: Leszno
- Gmina: Włoszakowice

Adamowo [adaˈmɔvɔ] is a settlement in the administrative district of Gmina Włoszakowice, within Leszno County, Greater Poland Voivodeship, in west-central Poland.
