= Bukówiec Górny =

- Village
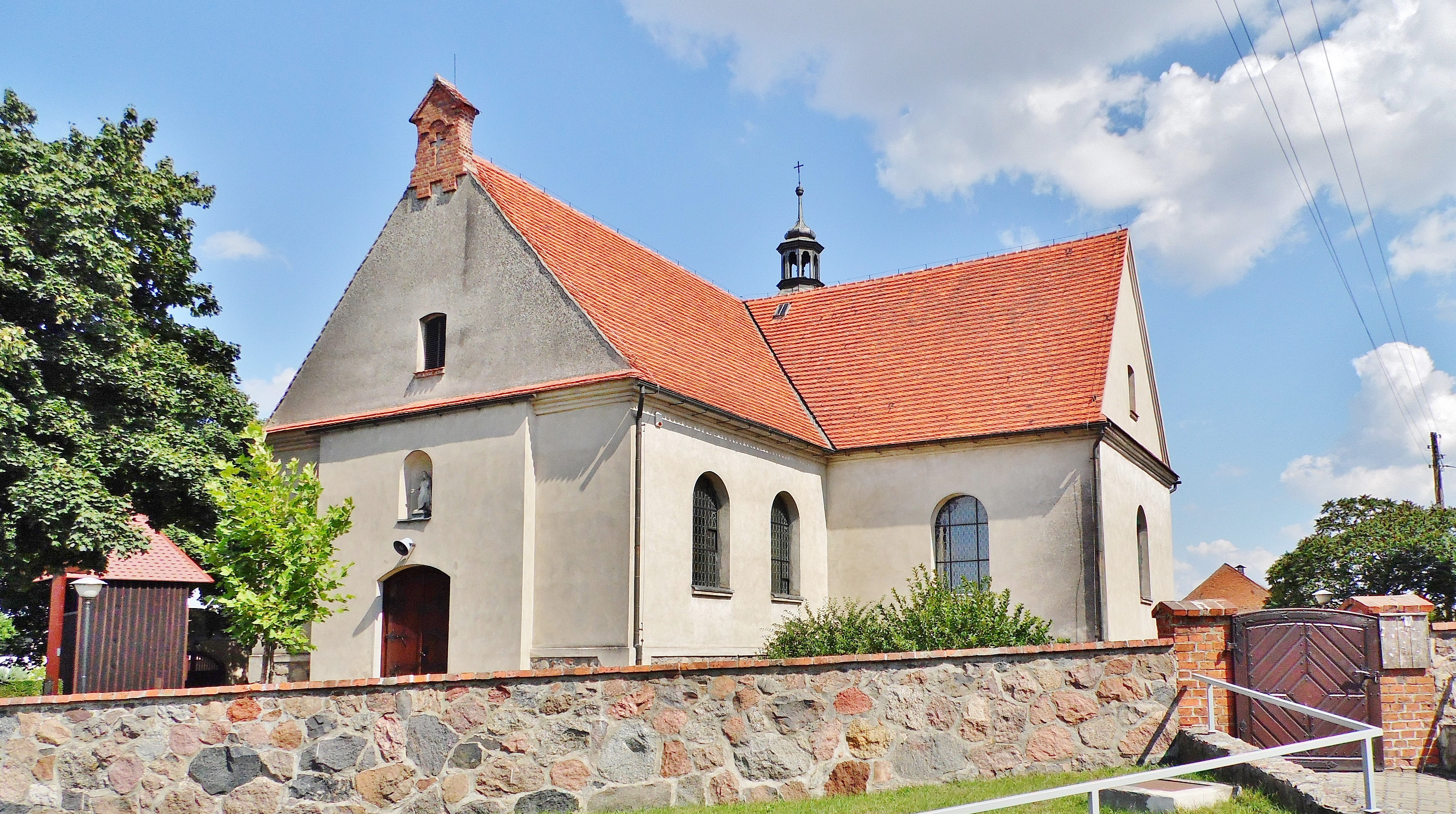
- Saint Martin church in Bukówiec Górny

- Location within Poland
- Coordinates: 51°56′43″N 16°24′43″E
- Country: Poland
- Voivodeship: Greater Poland
- County: Leszno
- Gmina: Włoszakowice

Population
  - Total: 2,137
- Time zone: UTC+1 (CET)
  - Summer (DST): UTC+2 (CEST)
- Vehicle registration: PLE

Bukówiec Górny [buˈkuvjɛt͡s ˈɡurnɨ] is a village in the administrative district of Gmina Włoszakowice, within Leszno County, Greater Poland Voivodeship, in west-central Poland.

According to the 1921 census, the village had a population of 1,602, 99,94% Polish by nationality and 100% Catholic by confession.
