= Sądzia =

- Village
- Location within Poland
- Coordinates: 51°55′20″N 16°25′58″E
- Country: Poland
- Voivodeship: Greater Poland
- County: Leszno
- Gmina: Włoszakowice
- Population: 200

Sądzia [ˈsɔnd͡ʑa] is a village in the administrative district of Gmina Włoszakowice, within Leszno County, Greater Poland Voivodeship, in west-central Poland.
