= Jabłonna, Leszno County =

Jabłonna
- Village
- Location within Poland
- Coordinates: 51°43′N 16°39′E
- Country: Poland
- Voivodeship: Greater Poland
- County: Leszno
- Gmina: Rydzyna

Jabłonna [jaˈbwɔnna] is a village in the administrative district of Gmina Rydzyna, within Leszno County, Greater Poland Voivodeship, in west-central Poland.
