= Piotrowicz =

Piotrowicz (neuter), Piotrowiczowa (archaic feminine) is a Polish-language surname derived from the given name Piotr (Peter). Notable people with this surname include:

- Robert Piotrowicz (born 1973), Polish sound artist, composer, and improviser.
- Marek Piotrowicz (born 1963), Polish football manager and player
- Maria Piotrowiczowa (1839 – 1863), Polish insurgent and revolutionary
- Stanisław Piotrowicz (1940–2020), Polish politician and civil servant
