= Wilanów, Greater Poland Voivodeship =

Wilanów
- Village
- Location within Poland
- Coordinates: 51°53′18″N 16°12′17″E
- Country: Poland
- Voivodeship: Greater Poland
- County: Leszno
- Gmina: Wijewo

Wilanów [viˈlanuf] is a village in the administrative district of Gmina Wijewo, within Leszno County, Greater Poland Voivodeship, in west-central Poland.
