= Junoszyn =

- Settlement
- Location within Poland
- Coordinates: 51°43′22″N 16°42′23″E
- Country: Poland
- Voivodeship: Greater Poland
- County: Leszno
- Gmina: Rydzyna

Junoszyn [juˈnɔʂɨn] is a settlement in the administrative district of Gmina Rydzyna, within Leszno County, Greater Poland Voivodeship, in west-central Poland.
