= Brenno, Poland =

Brenno
- Village
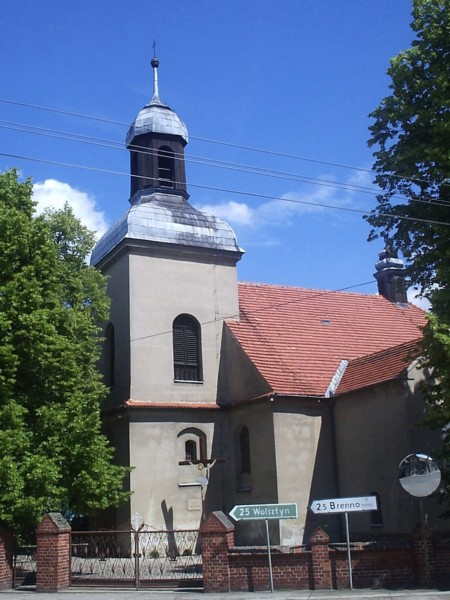
- Church of Saint Hedwig

- Location within Poland
- Coordinates: 51°56′N 16°13′E
- Country: Poland
- Voivodeship: Greater Poland
- County: Leszno
- Gmina: Wijewo
- Population (approx.): 1,200

Brenno [ˈbrɛnnɔ] is a village in the administrative district of Gmina Wijewo, within Leszno County, Greater Poland Voivodeship, in west-central Poland.

The village has an approximate population of 1,200.
