= Zbarzewo =

- Village
- Location within Poland
- Coordinates: 51°52′N 16°23′E
- Country: Poland
- Voivodeship: Greater Poland
- County: Leszno
- Gmina: Włoszakowice

Zbarzewo [zbaˈʐɛvɔ] is a village in the administrative district of Gmina Włoszakowice, within Leszno County, Greater Poland Voivodeship, in west-central Poland.
