= Tworzanice =

- Village
- Location within Poland
- Coordinates: 51°49′N 16°43′E
- Country: Poland
- Voivodeship: Greater Poland
- County: Leszno
- Gmina: Rydzyna

Tworzanice [tfɔʐaˈnit͡sɛ] is a village in the administrative district of Gmina Rydzyna, within Leszno County, Greater Poland Voivodeship, in west-central Poland.
