= Targowisko =

Targowisko may refer to the following places:

- Targowisko, Greater Poland Voivodeship (west-central Poland)
- Targowisko, Lesser Poland Voivodeship (south Poland)
- Targowisko, Lublin Voivodeship (east Poland)
