= Przybina =

- Village
- Location within Poland
- Coordinates: 51°48′30″N 16°43′46″E
- Country: Poland
- Voivodeship: Greater Poland
- County: Leszno
- Gmina: Rydzyna

Przybina [pʂɨˈbina] is a village in the administrative district of Gmina Rydzyna, within Leszno County, Greater Poland Voivodeship, in west-central Poland.
