= Mórkowo =

- Village
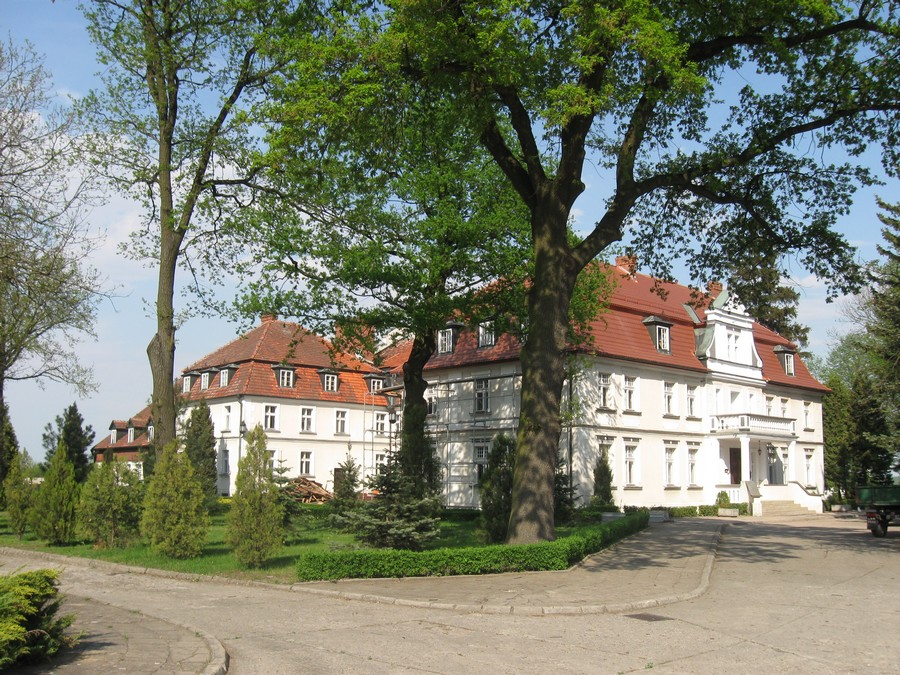
- Novitiate of the Society of Christ in Mórkowo

- Location within Poland
- Coordinates: 51°54′44″N 16°31′49″E
- Country: Poland
- Voivodeship: Greater Poland
- County: Leszno
- Gmina: Lipno

Mórkowo [murˈkɔvɔ] is a village in the administrative district of Gmina Lipno, within Leszno County, Greater Poland Voivodeship, in west-central Poland.

Located in the village's former estate house is the novitiate of the Society of Christ.
