= Radomicko, Greater Poland Voivodeship =

Radomicko
- Village
- Location within Poland
- Coordinates: 51°57′N 16°32′E
- Country: Poland
- Voivodeship: Greater Poland
- County: Leszno
- Gmina: Lipno
- Population: 311

Radomicko [radɔˈmit͡skɔ] is a village in the administrative district of Gmina Lipno, within Leszno County, Greater Poland Voivodeship, in west-central Poland.
