= Janopol, Greater Poland Voivodeship =

Janopol
- Village
- Location within Poland
- Coordinates: 51°56′24″N 16°36′26″E
- Country: Poland
- Voivodeship: Greater Poland
- County: Leszno
- Gmina: Lipno

Janopol [jaˈnɔpɔl] is a village in the administrative district of Gmina Lipno, within Leszno County, Greater Poland Voivodeship, in west-central Poland.
