= Boża Pomoc =

- Settlement
- Location within Poland
- Coordinates: 51°53′29″N 16°37′8″E
- Country: Poland
- Voivodeship: Greater Poland
- County: Leszno
- Gmina: Lipno

Boża Pomoc [ˈbɔʐa ˈpɔmɔt͡s] is a settlement in the administrative district of Gmina Lipno, within Leszno County, Greater Poland Voivodeship, in west-central Poland.
