= Ujazdowo, Greater Poland Voivodeship =

Ujazdowo
- Village
- Location within Poland
- Coordinates: 51°57′1″N 16°20′41″E
- Country: Poland
- Voivodeship: Greater Poland
- County: Leszno
- Gmina: Włoszakowice
- Population: 100

Ujazdowo [ujazˈdɔvɔ] is a village in the administrative district of Gmina Włoszakowice, within Leszno County, Greater Poland Voivodeship, in west-central Poland.
