= Krzyżowiec, Greater Poland Voivodeship =

Krzyżowiec
- Village
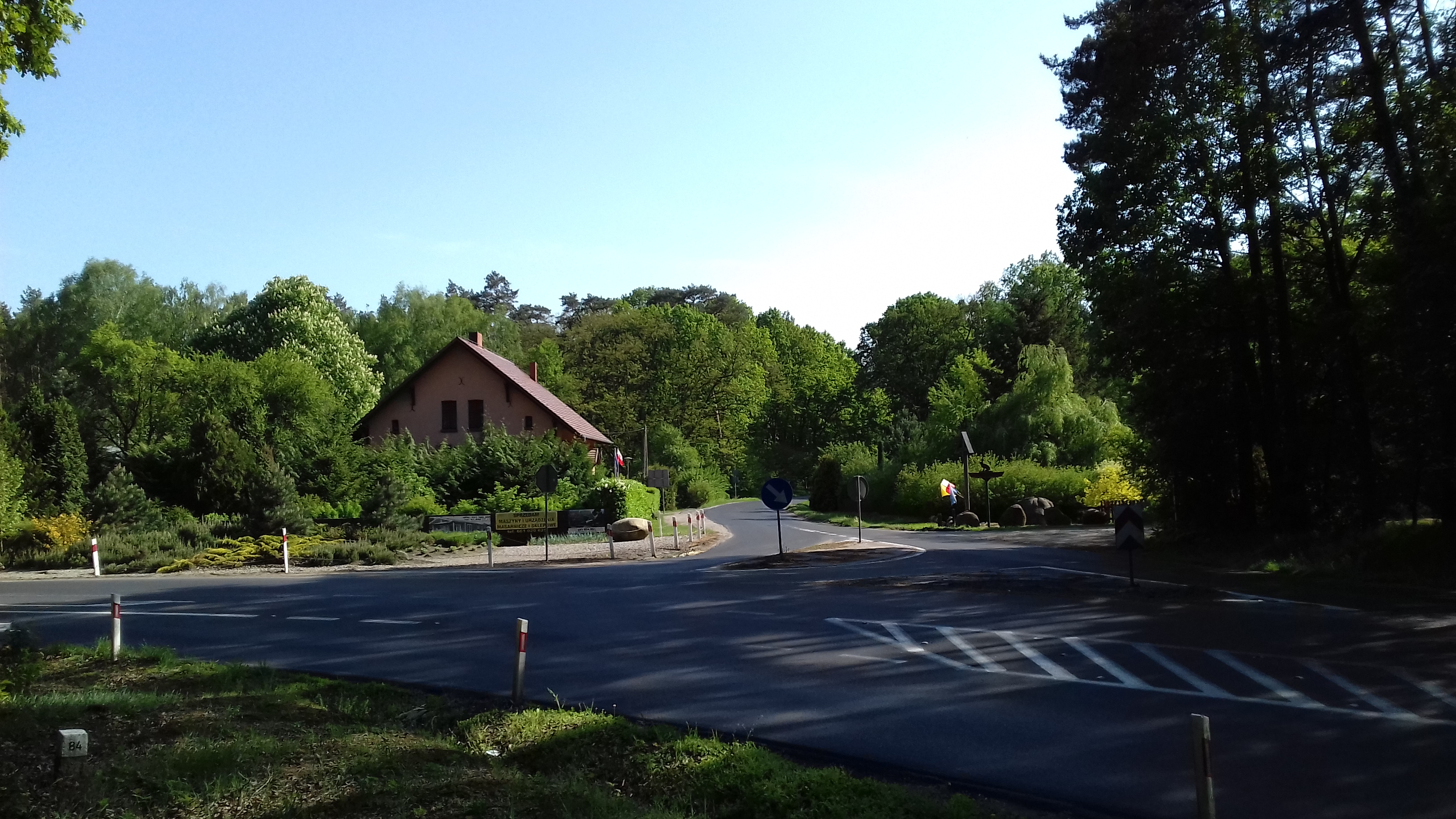
- Krzyżowiec village

- Location within Poland
- Coordinates: 51°53′49″N 16°21′35″E
- Country: Poland
- Voivodeship: Greater Poland
- County: Leszno
- Gmina: Włoszakowice

Krzyżowiec [kʂɨˈʐɔvjɛt͡s] is a village in the administrative district of Gmina Włoszakowice, within Leszno County, Greater Poland Voivodeship, in west-central Poland.
