= Filipowo =

- Village
- Location within Poland
- Coordinates: 51°53′39″N 16°14′17″E
- Country: Poland
- Voivodeship: Greater Poland
- County: Leszno
- Gmina: Wijewo

Filipowo [filiˈpɔvɔ] is a village in the administrative district of Gmina Wijewo, within Leszno County, Greater Poland Voivodeship, in west-central Poland.
