= Tarnowałąka =

Tarnowa Łąka
- Village
- Location within Poland
- Coordinates: 51°45′N 16°37′E
- Country: Poland
- Voivodeship: Greater Poland
- County: Leszno
- Gmina: Rydzyna

Tarnowa Łąka [tarnɔvaˈwɔnka] is a village in the administrative district of Gmina Rydzyna, within Leszno County, Greater Poland Voivodeship, in west-central Poland.
