= Tłucznia =

- Village
- Location within Poland
- Coordinates: 51°54′55″N 16°17′56″E
- Country: Poland
- Voivodeship: Greater Poland
- County: Leszno
- Gmina: Włoszakowice

Tłucznia [ˈtwut͡ʂɲa] is a village in the administrative district of Gmina Włoszakowice, within Leszno County, Greater Poland Voivodeship, in west-central Poland.
