= Potrzebowo, Leszno County =

Potrzebowo
- Village
- Location within Poland
- Coordinates: 51°54′N 16°8′E
- Country: Poland
- Voivodeship: Greater Poland
- County: Leszno
- Gmina: Wijewo
- Website: www.potrzebowo.pl

Potrzebowo [pɔtʂɛˈbɔvɔ] is a village in the administrative district of Gmina Wijewo, within Leszno County, Greater Poland Voivodeship, in west-central Poland.
