= Maruszewo, Greater Poland Voivodeship =

Maruszewo
- Village
- Location within Poland
- Coordinates: 51°49′05″N 16°41′30″E
- Country: Poland
- Voivodeship: Greater Poland
- County: Leszno
- Gmina: Rydzyna
- Population: 74

Maruszewo [maruˈʂɛvɔ] is a village in the administrative district of Gmina Rydzyna, within Leszno County, Greater Poland Voivodeship, in west-central Poland.
