= Grotniki =

Grotniki may refer to the following places:

- Grotniki, Greater Poland Voivodeship (west-central Poland)
- Grotniki, Łódź Voivodeship (central Poland)
- Grotniki, West Pomeranian Voivodeship (north-west Poland)
