= Boguszyn, Leszno County =

Boguszyn
- Village
- Location within Poland
- Coordinates: 51°56′36″N 16°28′14″E
- Country: Poland
- Voivodeship: Greater Poland
- County: Leszno
- Gmina: Włoszakowice
- Population: 350

Boguszyn [bɔˈɡuʂɨn] is a village in the administrative district of Gmina Włoszakowice, within Leszno County, Greater Poland Voivodeship, in west-central Poland.
