= Berlinek, Greater Poland Voivodeship =

Berlinek
- Village
- Location within Poland
- Coordinates: 51°56′4″N 16°21′37″E
- Country: Poland
- Voivodeship: Greater Poland
- County: Leszno
- Gmina: Włoszakowice

Berlinek [bɛrˈlinɛk] is a village in the administrative district of Gmina Włoszakowice, within Leszno County, Greater Poland Voivodeship, in west-central Poland.
