= Trzebidza =

- Settlement
- Location within Poland
- Coordinates: 51°59′22″N 16°22′15″E
- Country: Poland
- Voivodeship: Greater Poland
- County: Leszno
- Gmina: Włoszakowice

Trzebidza [tʂɛˈbid͡za] is a settlement in the administrative district of Gmina Włoszakowice, within Leszno County, Greater Poland Voivodeship, in west-central Poland.
