= Klonówiec =

- Village
- Location within Poland
- Coordinates: 51°54′0″N 16°35′0″E
- Country: Poland
- Voivodeship: Greater Poland
- County: Leszno
- Gmina: Lipno
- Elevation: 89 m (292 ft)
- Population: 363

Klonówiec [klɔˈnuvjɛt͡s] is a village in the administrative district of Gmina Lipno, within Leszno County, Greater Poland Voivodeship, in west-central Poland.
