= Wyciążkowo =

- Village
- Location within Poland
- Coordinates: 51°54′N 16°37′E
- Country: Poland
- Voivodeship: Greater Poland
- County: Leszno
- Gmina: Lipno

Wyciążkowo [vɨt͡ɕɔ̃ʂˈkɔvɔ] is a village in the administrative district of Gmina Lipno, within Leszno County, Greater Poland Voivodeship, in west-central Poland.
