= Nowawieś =

Nowa Wieś
- Village
- Location within Poland
- Coordinates: 51°50′17″N 16°40′57″E
- Country: Poland
- Voivodeship: Greater Poland
- County: Leszno
- Gmina: Rydzyna
- Population: 388

Nowawieś [nɔˈvavjɛɕ] is a village in the administrative district of Gmina Rydzyna, within Leszno County, Greater Poland Voivodeship, in west-central Poland.
