= Sulejewo, Leszno County =

Sulejewo
- Village
- Location within Poland
- Coordinates: 51°57′N 16°38′E
- Country: Poland
- Voivodeship: Greater Poland
- County: Leszno
- Gmina: Lipno

Sulejewo [sulɛˈjɛvɔ] is a village in the administrative district of Gmina Lipno, within Leszno County, Greater Poland Voivodeship, in west-central Poland.
