= Mścigniew, Greater Poland Voivodeship =

Mścigniew
- Village
- Location within Poland
- Coordinates: 51°53′40″N 16°17′52″E
- Country: Poland
- Voivodeship: Greater Poland
- County: Leszno
- Gmina: Włoszakowice

Mścigniew [ˈmɕt͡ɕiɡɲɛf] is a village in the administrative district of Gmina Włoszakowice, within Leszno County, Greater Poland Voivodeship, in west-central Poland.

In the interwar period, the town was home to a post of the 17th Customs Battalion, and later to the "Mścigniew" First Line Border Guard post. In the years 1975–1998, the town administratively belonged to the Leszno Voivodeship.
