= Kłoda, Leszno County =

Kłoda
- Village
- Location within Poland
- Coordinates: 51°46′N 16°40′E
- Country: Poland
- Voivodeship: Greater Poland
- County: Leszno
- Gmina: Rydzyna
- Population: 1,200

Kłoda [ˈkwɔda] is a village in the administrative district of Gmina Rydzyna, within Leszno County, Greater Poland Voivodeship, in west-central Poland.
