= Żakowo, Greater Poland Voivodeship =

Żakowo
- Village
- Location within Poland
- Coordinates: 51°55′N 16°35′E
- Country: Poland
- Voivodeship: Greater Poland
- County: Leszno
- Gmina: Lipno

Żakowo [ʐaˈkɔvɔ] is a village in the administrative district of Gmina Lipno, within Leszno County, Greater Poland Voivodeship, in west-central Poland.

== History ==
The name Żakowo can be traced back to 1393 when it was recorded in the testimony of one Piotr Piotrasz (who also later took on the name Żakowski). In 1564, two families were recorded paying the bishops of Poznań for land in Żakowo. 16 years later, in 1580, one of these families was recorded as possessing 15 sheep. In 1793, Żakowo became the property of one Kordula, wife of Jan Turno, stolnik (court official) at the royal village of Kaliska and later general of the Polish army. During the Partitions of Poland, the Kingdom of Prussia referred to the village as Saake. By the end of the 19th century, Żakowo had grown to a population of 329, with 120 inhabiting the farming settlement and 109 inhabiting the manorial estate. From 1908, Żakowo was subject to the Prussian Settlement Commission established in 1886 by Otto von Bismarck. Manorial land was parcelled out to German colonists. In 1926, the village was in the Leszno district and had a population of 153. There was a colonial shop, J. Chwirota, and a forge, A. Rybakowski.
