= Skarzyn =

Skarzyn may refer to the following places in Poland:

- Skarzyn, Masovian Voivodeship
- Skarżyń, Greater Poland Voivodeship
- Skarżyn, Greater Poland Voivodeship
- Skarżyn, Łódź Voivodeship
- Skarżyn, Ostrołęka County, Masovian Voivodeship
- Skarżyn, Siedlce County, Masovian Voivodeship
- Skarżyn, Węgrów County, Masovian Voivodeship
- Skarżyn, Warmian-Masurian Voivodeship
