= Siedmiórki =

- Settlement
- Location within Poland
- Coordinates: 51°54′12″N 16°10′25″E
- Country: Poland
- Voivodeship: Greater Poland
- County: Leszno
- Gmina: Wijewo

Siedmiórki [ɕɛdˈmjurki] is a settlement in the administrative district of Gmina Wijewo, within Leszno County, Greater Poland Voivodeship, in west-central Poland.
