= Lasotki, Greater Poland Voivodeship =

Lasotki
- Village
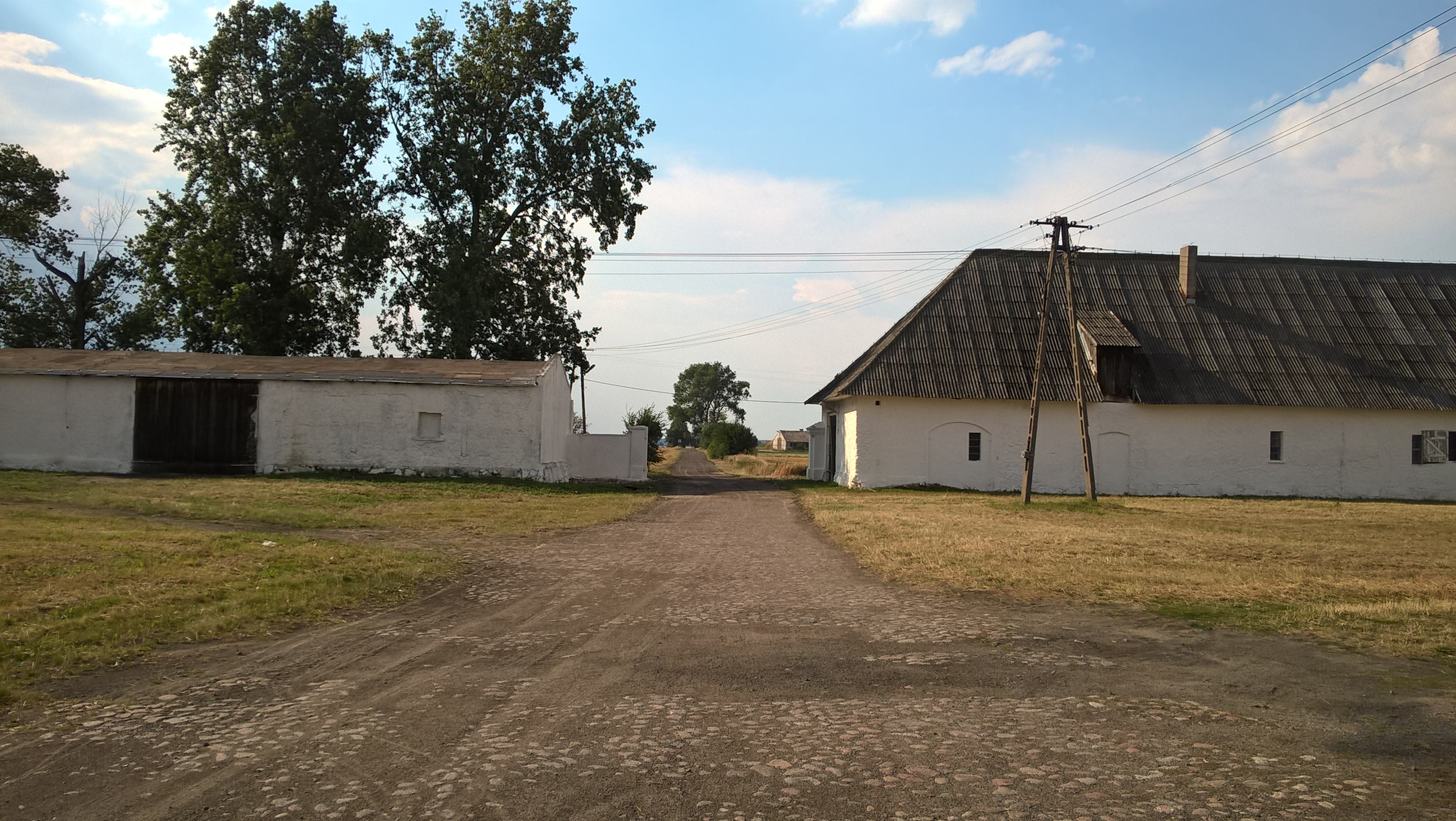

- Location within Poland
- Coordinates: 51°45′08″N 16°42′21″E
- Country: Poland
- Voivodeship: Greater Poland
- County: Leszno
- Gmina: Rydzyna

Lasotki [laˈsɔtki] is a village in the administrative district of Gmina Rydzyna, within Leszno County, Greater Poland Voivodeship, in west-central Poland.
