= Papiernia, Leszno County =

Papiernia
- Village
- Location within Poland
- Coordinates: 51°55′14″N 16°17′23″E
- Country: Poland
- Voivodeship: Greater Poland
- County: Leszno
- Gmina: Włoszakowice

Papiernia [paˈpjɛrɲa] is a village in the administrative district of Gmina Włoszakowice, within Leszno County, Greater Poland Voivodeship, in west-central Poland.
