= Kaczkowo, Greater Poland Voivodeship =

Kaczkowo
- Village
- Location within Poland
- Coordinates: 51°45′N 16°41′E
- Country: Poland
- Voivodeship: Greater Poland
- County: Leszno
- Gmina: Rydzyna
- Population (approx.): 400

Kaczkowo [kat͡ʂˈkɔvɔ] is a village in the administrative district of Gmina Rydzyna, within Leszno County, Greater Poland Voivodeship, in west-central Poland.

The village has an approximate population of 400.
