= Wilkowo-Gaj =

- Settlement
- Location within Poland
- Coordinates: 51°53′41″N 16°30′35″E
- Country: Poland
- Voivodeship: Greater Poland
- County: Leszno
- Gmina: Lipno

Wilkowo-Gaj (Polish pronunciation: [vilˈkɔvɔ ˈɡaj]) is a settlement in the administrative district of Gmina Lipno, within Leszno County, Greater Poland Voivodeship, in west-central Poland.
