= Karolewko, Greater Poland Voivodeship =

Karolewko
- Village
- Location within Poland
- Coordinates: 51°53′07″N 16°33′47″E
- Country: Poland
- Voivodeship: Greater Poland
- County: Leszno
- Gmina: Lipno

Karolewko [karɔˈlɛfkɔ] is a village in the administrative district of Gmina Lipno, within Leszno County, Greater Poland Voivodeship, in west-central Poland.
