= Gmina Lipno =

Gmina Lipno may refer to either of the following rural administrative districts in Poland:

- Gmina Lipno, Greater Poland Voivodeship
- Gmina Lipno, Kuyavian-Pomeranian Voivodeship
