= Wilkowice, Greater Poland Voivodeship =

Wilkowice
- Village
- Location within Poland
- Coordinates: 51°53′N 16°32′E
- Country: Poland
- Voivodeship: Greater Poland
- County: Leszno
- Gmina: Lipno
- Population: 1,589
- Website: http://www.wilkowice.glt.pl

Wilkowice [vilkɔˈvit͡sɛ] is a village in the administrative district of Gmina Lipno, within Leszno County, Greater Poland Voivodeship, in west-central Poland.

In 2016, the village had a population of 2,570.
