= Charbielin, Leszno County =

Charbielin
- Village
- Location within Poland
- Coordinates: 51°58′44″N 16°22′10″E
- Country: Poland
- Voivodeship: Greater Poland
- County: Leszno
- Gmina: Włoszakowice
- Population: 80

Charbielin [xarˈbjɛlin] is a village in the administrative district of Gmina Włoszakowice, within Leszno County, Greater Poland Voivodeship, in west-central Poland.
