= Augustowo, Leszno County =

Augustowo
- Village
- Location within Poland
- Coordinates: 51°45′22″N 16°40′34″E
- Country: Poland
- Voivodeship: Greater Poland
- County: Leszno
- Gmina: Rydzyna
- Population: 70

Augustowo [auɡusˈtɔvɔ] is a village in the administrative district of Gmina Rydzyna, within Leszno County, Greater Poland Voivodeship, in west-central Poland.
