= Kierzki =

Kierzki may refer to the following places:

- Kierzki, Greater Poland Voivodeship (west-central Poland)
- Kierzki, Podlaskie Voivodeship (north-east Poland)
- Kierzki, Silesian Voivodeship (south Poland)
- Kierzki, Warmian-Masurian Voivodeship (north Poland)
