= Targowisko, Greater Poland Voivodeship =

Targowisko
- Village
- Location within Poland
- Coordinates: 51°57′N 16°33′E
- Country: Poland
- Voivodeship: Greater Poland
- County: Leszno
- Gmina: Lipno

Targowisko [tarɡɔˈviskɔ] is a village in the administrative district of Gmina Lipno, within Leszno County, Greater Poland Voivodeship, in west-central Poland.
