= Gmina Wijewo =

Gmina Wijewo Wijewo Commune
- Gmina
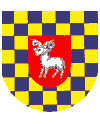
- Coat of arms
- Interactive map of Gmina Wijewo
- Coordinates (Wijewo): 51°55′N 16°12′E
- Country: Poland
- Voivodeship: Greater Poland
- County: Leszno County
- Seat: Wijewo

Area
  - Total: 61.37 km^{2} (23.70 sq mi)

Population (2006)
  - Total: 3,463
  - Density: 56.43/km^{2} (146.1/sq mi)
- Website: http://www.wijewo.pl, http://www.wijewo.com

Gmina Wijewo is a rural gmina (administrative district) in Leszno County, Greater Poland Voivodeship, in west-central Poland. Its seat is the village of Wijewo, which lies approximately 27 kilometres (17 mi) west of Leszno and 73 km (45 mi) south-west of the regional capital Poznań.

The gmina covers an area of 61.37 square kilometres (23.7 sq mi), and as of 2006 its total population was 3,463.

The gmina contains part of the protected area called Przemęt Landscape Park.

== Villages ==
Gmina Wijewo contains the villages and settlements of Brenno, Filipowo, Kalek, Miastko, Potrzebowo, Przylesie, Radomyśl, Siedmiórki, Wijewo, Wilanów and Zaborówiec.

== Neighbouring gminas ==
Gmina Wijewo is bordered by the gminas of Przemęt, Sława, Włoszakowice and Wschowa.
