= Gmina Włoszakowice =

Gmina Włoszakowice Włoszakowice Commune
- Gmina
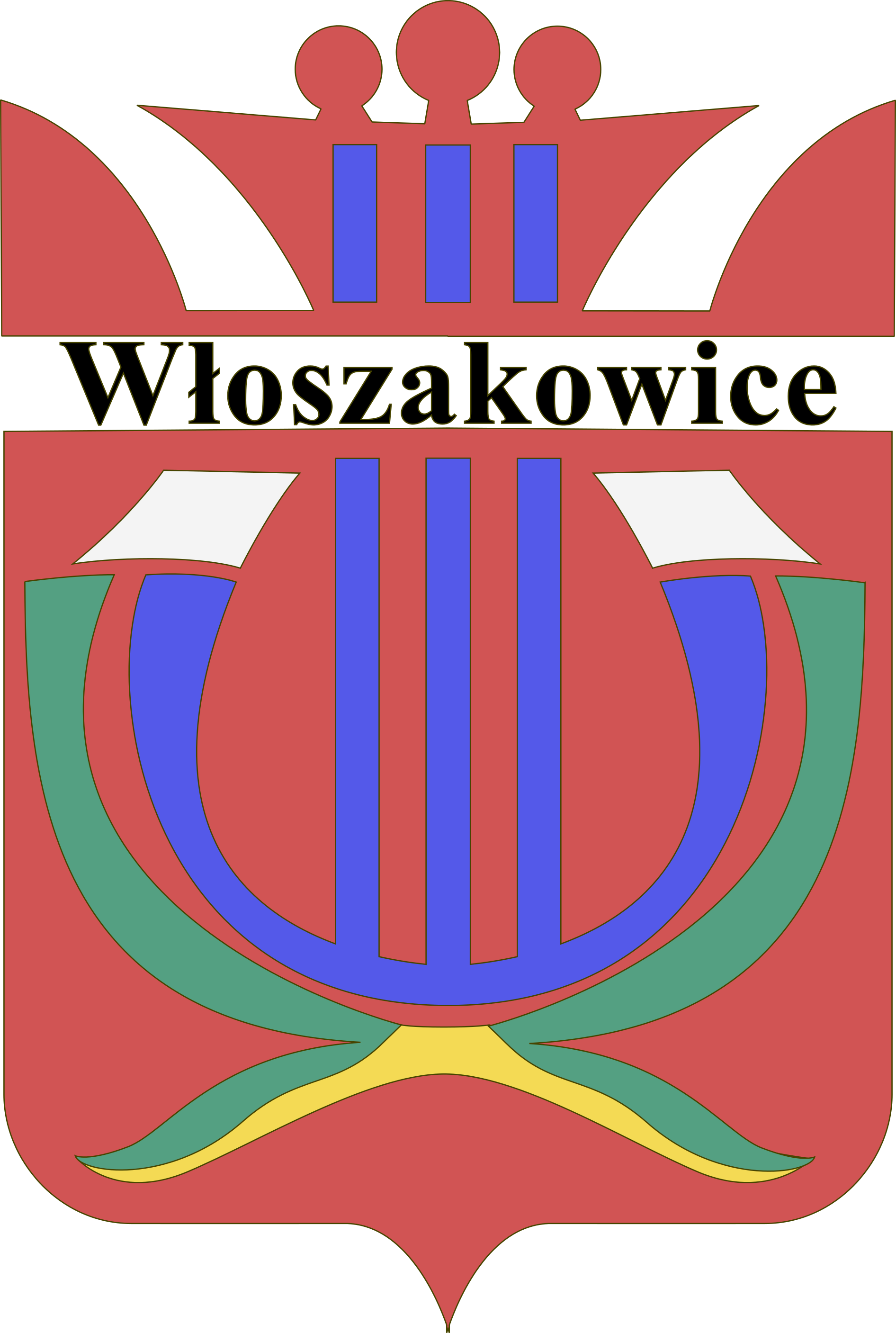
- Coat of arms
- Interactive map of Gmina Włoszakowice
- Coordinates (Włoszakowice): 51°56′N 16°22′E
- Country: Poland
- Voivodeship: Greater Poland
- County: Leszno County
- Seat: Włoszakowice

Area
  - Total: 127.15 km^{2} (49.09 sq mi)

Population (2006)
  - Total: 8,627
  - Density: 67.85/km^{2} (175.7/sq mi)
- Website: http://www.wloszakowice.pl

Gmina Włoszakowice is a rural gmina (administrative district) in Leszno County, Greater Poland Voivodeship, in west-central Poland. Its seat is the village of Włoszakowice, which lies approximately 17 kilometres (11 mi) north-west of Leszno and 64 km (40 mi) south-west of the regional capital Poznań.

The gmina covers an area of 127.15 square kilometres (49.1 sq mi), and as of 2006 its total population is 8,627.

The gmina contains part of the protected area called Przemęt Landscape Park.

== Villages ==
Gmina Włoszakowice contains the villages and settlements of Adamowo, Berlinek, Boguszyn, Boszkowo, Boszkowo-Letnisko, Bukówiec Górny, Charbielin, Daćbogi, Dłużyna, Dominice, Grotniki, Janówko, Jezierzyce Kościelne, Kierzki, Koczury, Krzycko Wielkie, Krzyżowiec, Mścigniew, Papiernia, Piorunowo, Sądzia, Sądzia-Cegielnia, Skarżyń, Tłucznia, Trzebidza, Ujazdowo, Włoszakowice, Zbarzewo and Zbarzyk.

== Neighbouring gminas ==
Gmina Włoszakowice is bordered by the gminas of Lipno, Przemęt, Śmigiel, Święciechowa, Wijewo and Wschowa.
