= Ratowice, Greater Poland Voivodeship =

Ratowice
- Village
- Location within Poland
- Coordinates: 51°57′N 16°36′E
- Country: Poland
- Voivodeship: Greater Poland
- County: Leszno
- Gmina: Lipno

Ratowice [ratɔˈvit͡sɛ] is a village in the administrative district of Gmina Lipno, within Leszno County, Greater Poland Voivodeship, in west-central Poland.
