= Grotniki, Greater Poland Voivodeship =

Grotniki
- Village
- Location within Poland
- Coordinates: 51°56′59″N 16°21′29″E
- Country: Poland
- Voivodeship: Greater Poland
- County: Leszno
- Gmina: Włoszakowice
- Population: 530

Grotniki [ɡrɔtˈniki] is a village in the administrative district of Gmina Włoszakowice, within Leszno County, Greater Poland Voivodeship, in west-central Poland.
