= Wijewo =

- Village
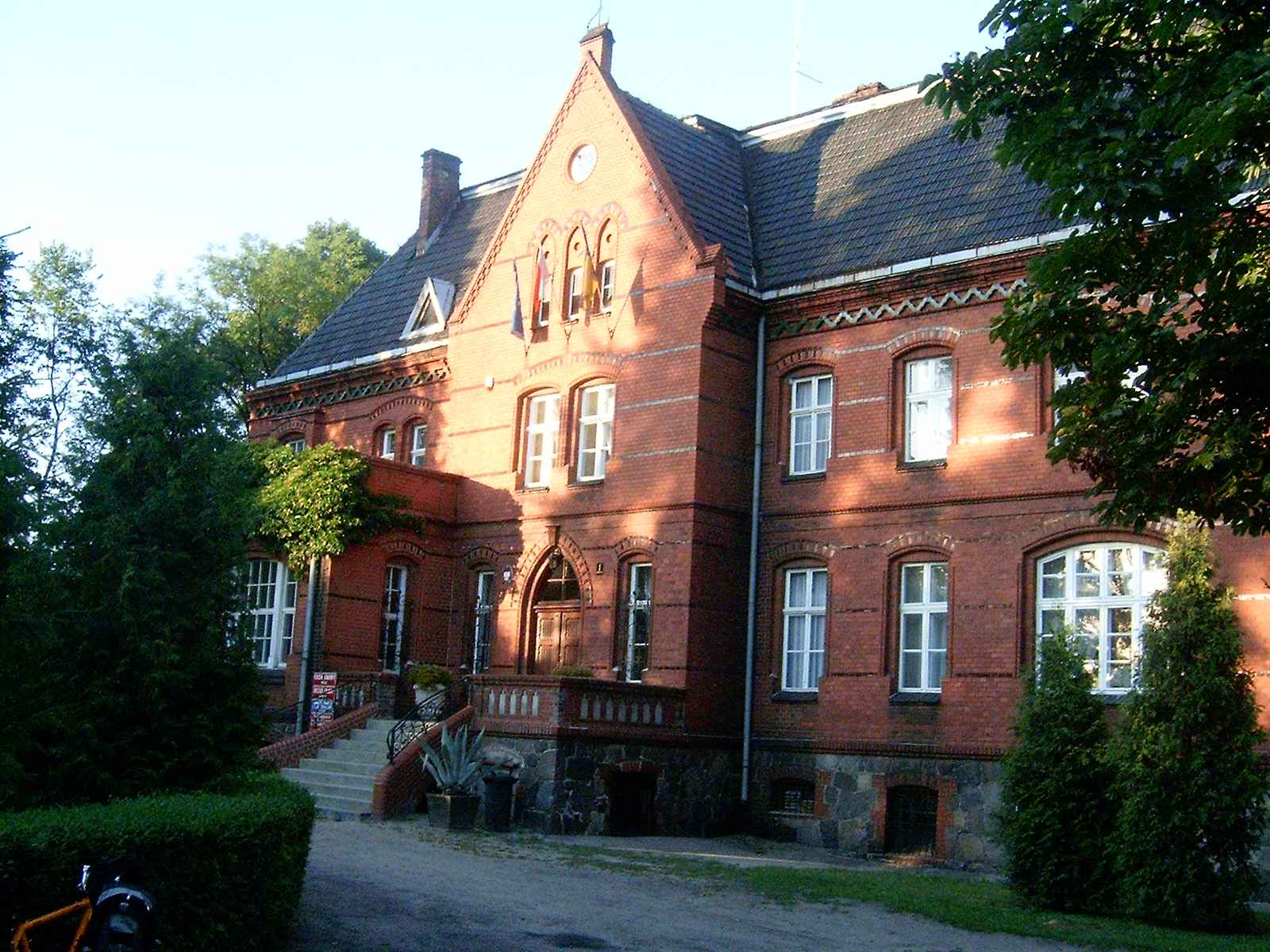
- Dwór in Wijewo

- Location within Poland
- Coordinates: 51°55′N 16°12′E
- Country: Poland
- Voivodeship: Greater Poland
- County: Leszno
- Gmina: Wijewo
- Population (approx.): 1,200

Wijewo [viˈjɛvɔ] is a village in Leszno County, Greater Poland Voivodeship, in west-central Poland. It is the seat of the gmina (administrative district) called Gmina Wijewo.

The village has an approximate population of 1,200.
