= Kierzki, Greater Poland Voivodeship =

Kierzki
- Settlement
- Location within Poland
- Coordinates: 51°58′19″N 16°24′26″E
- Country: Poland
- Voivodeship: Greater Poland
- County: Leszno
- Gmina: Włoszakowice

Kierzki [ˈkʲɛʂki] is a settlement in the administrative district of Gmina Włoszakowice, within Leszno County, Greater Poland Voivodeship, in west-central Poland.
