= Janówko, Greater Poland Voivodeship =

Janówko
- Settlement
- Location within Poland
- Coordinates: 51°57′22″N 16°25′35″E
- Country: Poland
- Voivodeship: Greater Poland
- County: Leszno
- Gmina: Włoszakowice

Janówko [jaˈnufkɔ] is a settlement in the administrative district of Gmina Włoszakowice, within Leszno County, Greater Poland Voivodeship, in west-central Poland.
