= Włoszakowice =

- Village
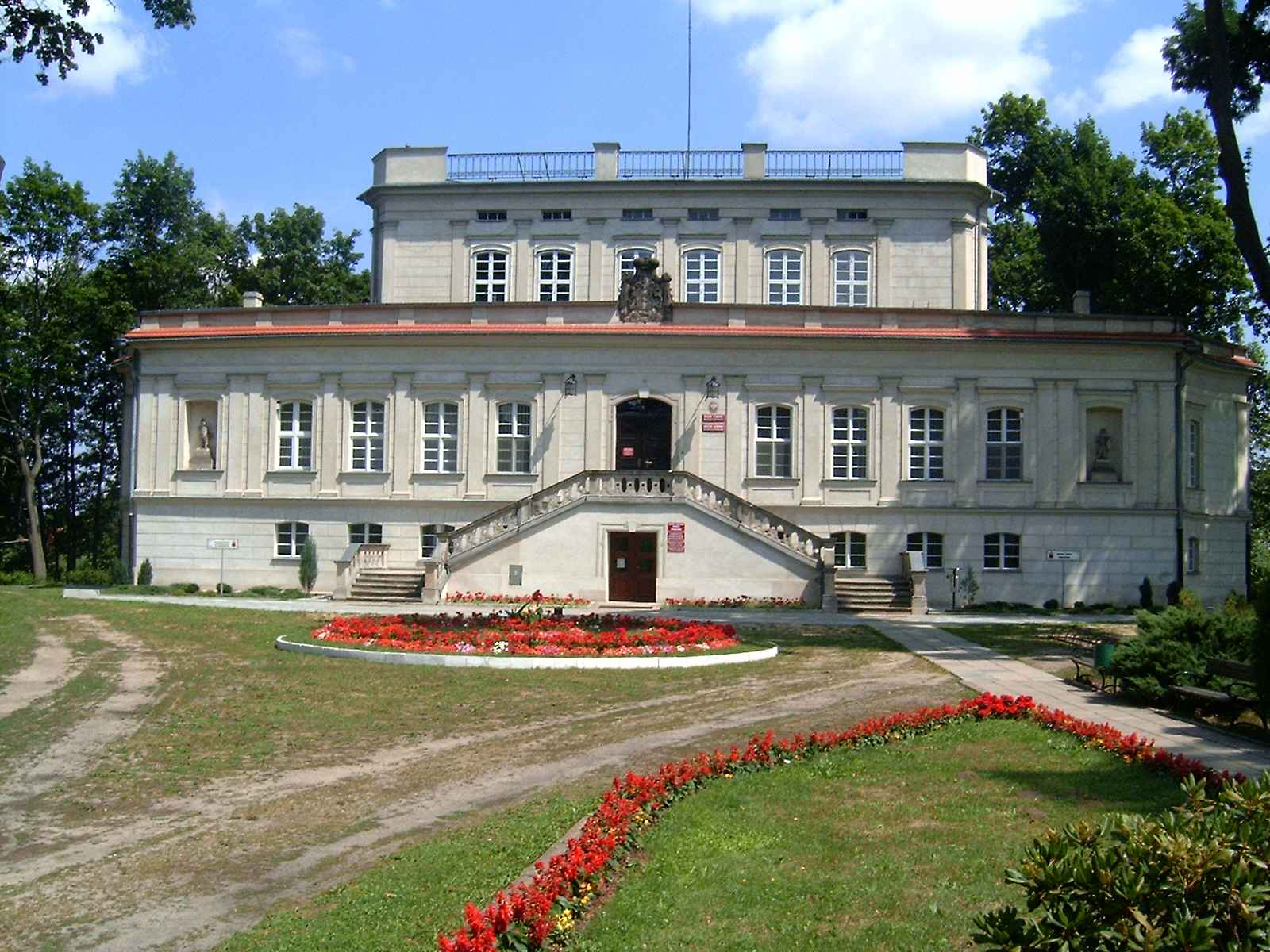
- Palace in the village

- Location within Poland
- Coordinates: 51°56′N 16°22′E
- Country: Poland
- Voivodeship: Greater Poland
- County: Leszno
- Gmina: Włoszakowice
- First mentioned: 1210

Population
  - Total: 2,960
- Time zone: UTC+1 (CET)
  - Summer (DST): UTC+2 (CEST)
- Vehicle registration: PLE
- Website: http://www.wloszakowice.pl/

Włoszakowice [vwɔʂakɔˈvit͡sɛ] is a village in Leszno County, Greater Poland Voivodeship, in west-central Poland. It is the seat of the gmina (administrative district) called Gmina Włoszakowice.

Landmarks of the village are the Sułkowski Palace, the Karol Kurpiński Museum dedicated to the Polish composer, who was born in the village in 1785, and the Baroque Holy Trinity church, where Kurpiński was baptized.

== History ==
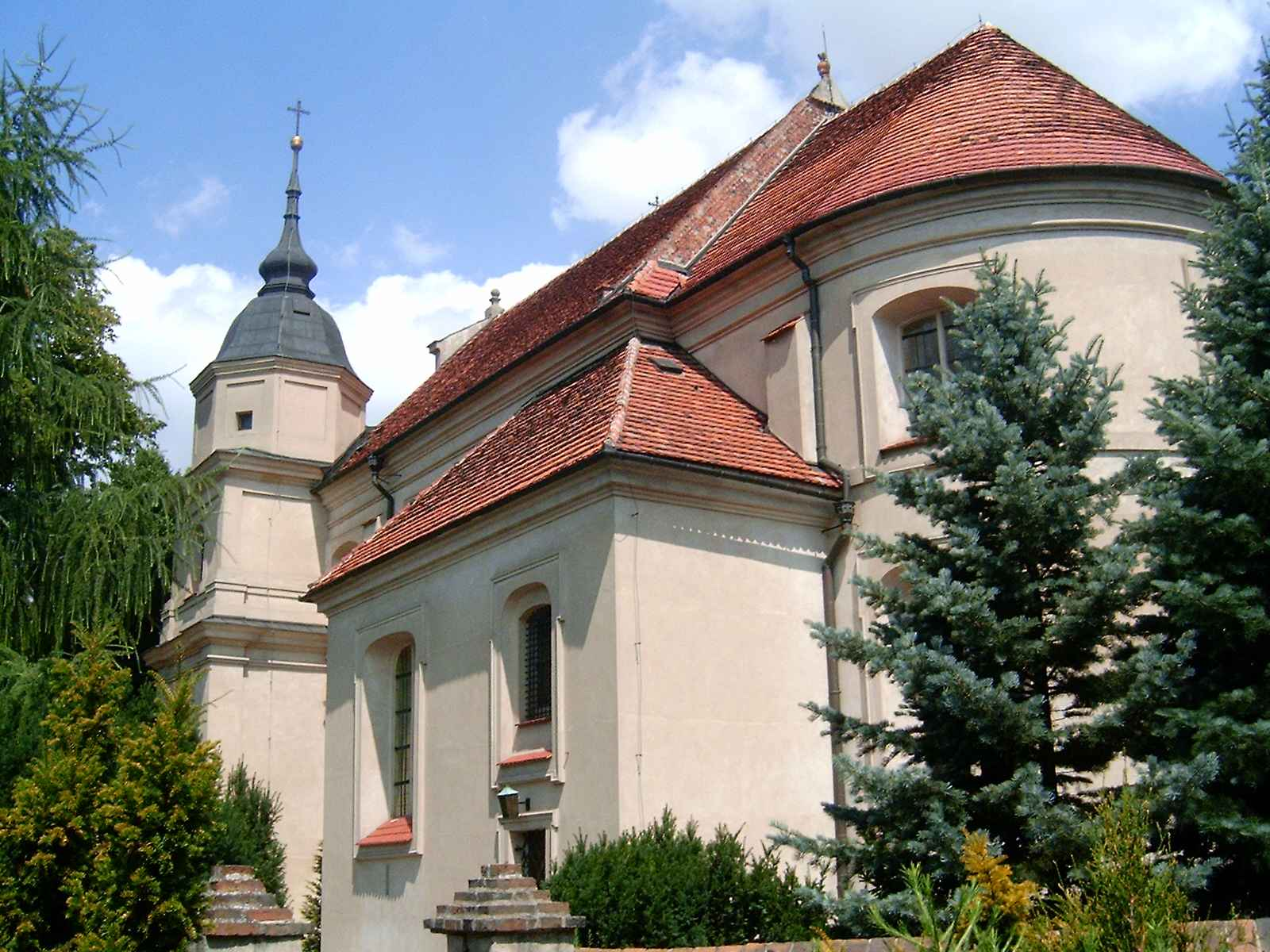
Baroque Holy Trinity church

The oldest known mention of the village comes from a document of Duke Władysław Odonic from 1210, when it was part of Piast-ruled Poland. Włoszakowice was a private village of Polish nobility, administratively located in the Kościan County in the Poznań Voivodeship in the Greater Poland Province. It was owned by the Opaliński family of Łodzia coat of arms, including the Queen consort of Poland Catherine Opalińska, and the Sułkowski family of Sulima coat of arms.

Following the joint German-Soviet invasion of Poland, which started World War II in September 1939, the village was occupied by Germany until 1945 and local Poles were subjected to various atrocities. On October 21, 1939, the German Einsatzgruppe VI carried out a public execution of Poles as part of the Intelligenzaktion. It was one of many massacres of Poles committed by Germany on October 20–23 across the region in attempt to pacify and terrorize the Polish population. In late 1940, the German gendarmerie carried out expulsions of Poles, whose farms were then handed over to German colonists as part of the Lebensraum policy. Expelled Poles were initially held in a transit camp in Łódź, where they were stripped of any valuable items, and then enslaved as forced labour or deported to the General Government in the more eastern part of German-occupied Poland.

== Transport ==
There is a railway station in the village.

== Sports ==
The Polish Cyclo-cross Championships were held in Włoszakowice in 2021.

== Notable people ==
- Karol Kurpiński (1785–1857), Polish composer
- Filip Kaminiarz (born 2001), Polish racing driver
