= Gmina Rydzyna =

Gmina Rydzyna Rydzyna Commune
- Gmina
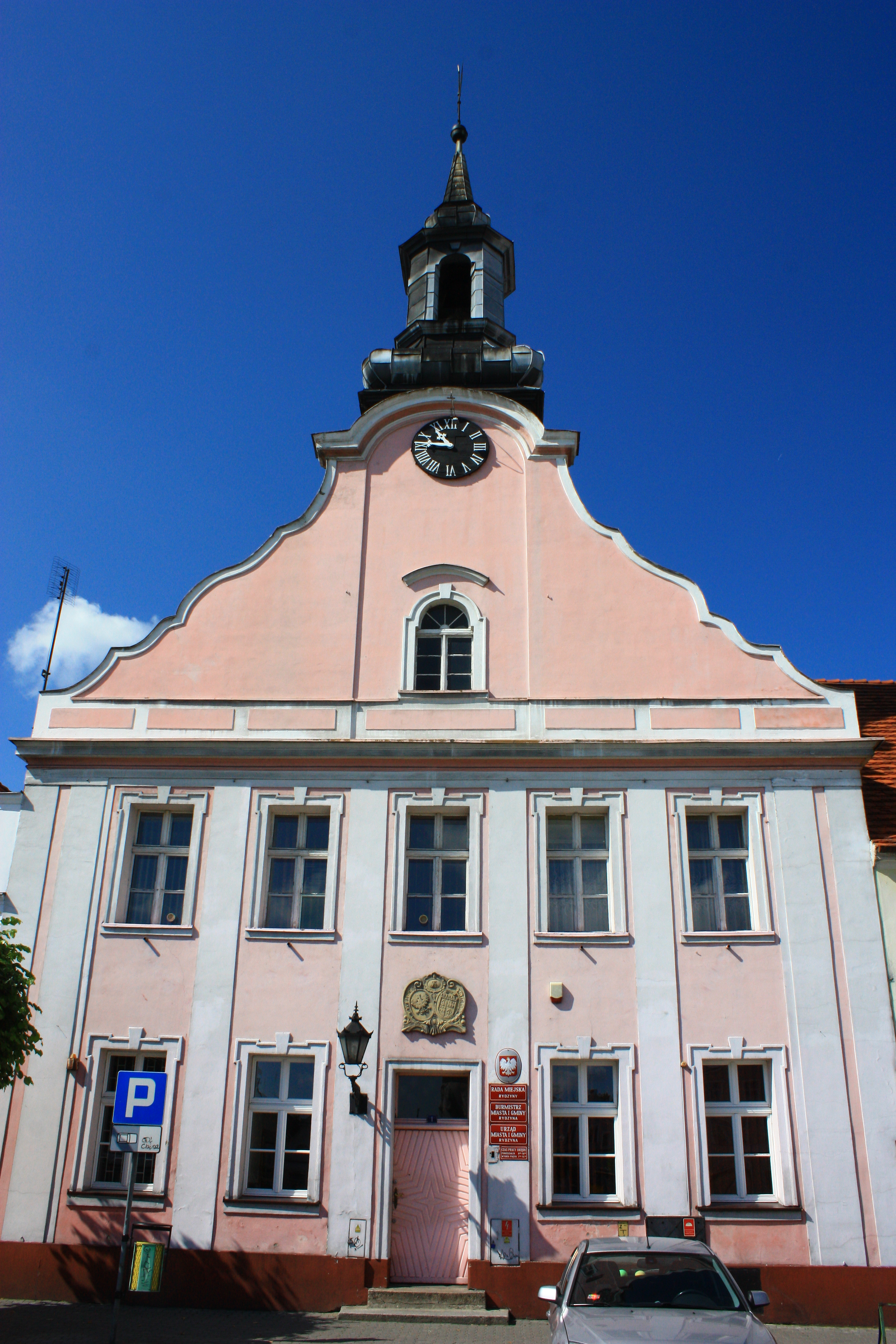
- Town Hall in Rydzyna, seat of the gmina office

- Flag Coat of arms
- Interactive map of Gmina Rydzyna
- Coordinates (Rydzyna): 51°48′N 16°40′E
- Country: Poland
- Voivodeship: Greater Poland
- County: Leszno County
- Seat: Rydzyna

Area
  - Total: 135.56 km^{2} (52.34 sq mi)

Population (2006)
  - Total: 8,076
  - Density: 59.58/km^{2} (154.3/sq mi)
  - Urban: 2,539
  - Rural: 5,537
- Time zone: UTC+1 (CET)
  - Summer (DST): UTC+2 (CEST)
- Website: http://www.rydzyna.pl/

Gmina Rydzyna is an urban-rural gmina (administrative district) in Leszno County, Greater Poland Voivodeship, in west-central Poland. Its seat is the town of Rydzyna, which lies approximately 9 kilometres (6 mi) south-east of Leszno and 69 km (43 mi) south of the regional capital Poznań.

The gmina covers an area of 135.56 square kilometres (52.3 sq mi), and as of 2006 its total population is 8,076 (out of which the population of Rydzyna amounts to 2,539, and the population of the rural part of the gmina is 5,537).

== Villages ==
Apart from the town of Rydzyna, Gmina Rydzyna contains the villages and settlements of Augustowo, Dąbcze, Jabłonna, Junoszyn, Kaczkowo, Kłoda, Lasotki, Maruszewo, Moraczewo, Nowawieś, Nowy Świat, Pomykowo, Przybina, Robczysko, Rojęczyn, Tarnowałąka, Tworzanice and Tworzanki.

== Neighbouring gminas ==
Gmina Rydzyna is bordered by the city of Leszno and by the gminas of Bojanowo, Góra, Krzemieniewo, Osieczna, Poniec and Święciechowa.
