= Władysław Śleboda =

Polish politician (1925–2009)

Mayor of Poznań
- In office 1975–1981
- Preceded by: Stanisław Cozaś
- Succeeded by: Stanisław Piotrowicz

Personal details
- Born: 20 June 1925 Dłużyna, Poland
- Died: 22 January 2009 (aged 83) Poznań, Poland
- Resting place: Junikowo Cemetery, Poznań, Poland
- Party: Polish Workers' Party (1946–1948); Polish United Workers' Party (1948–1990)

Władysław Śleboda (Polish: [vwaˈdɘ̟.swaf ɕlɛˈbɔ.da]; 20 June 1925 – 22 January 2009) was a Polish politician, and member of the Polish United Workers' Party. He was the mayor of Poznań from 1975 to 1981.

== Biography ==
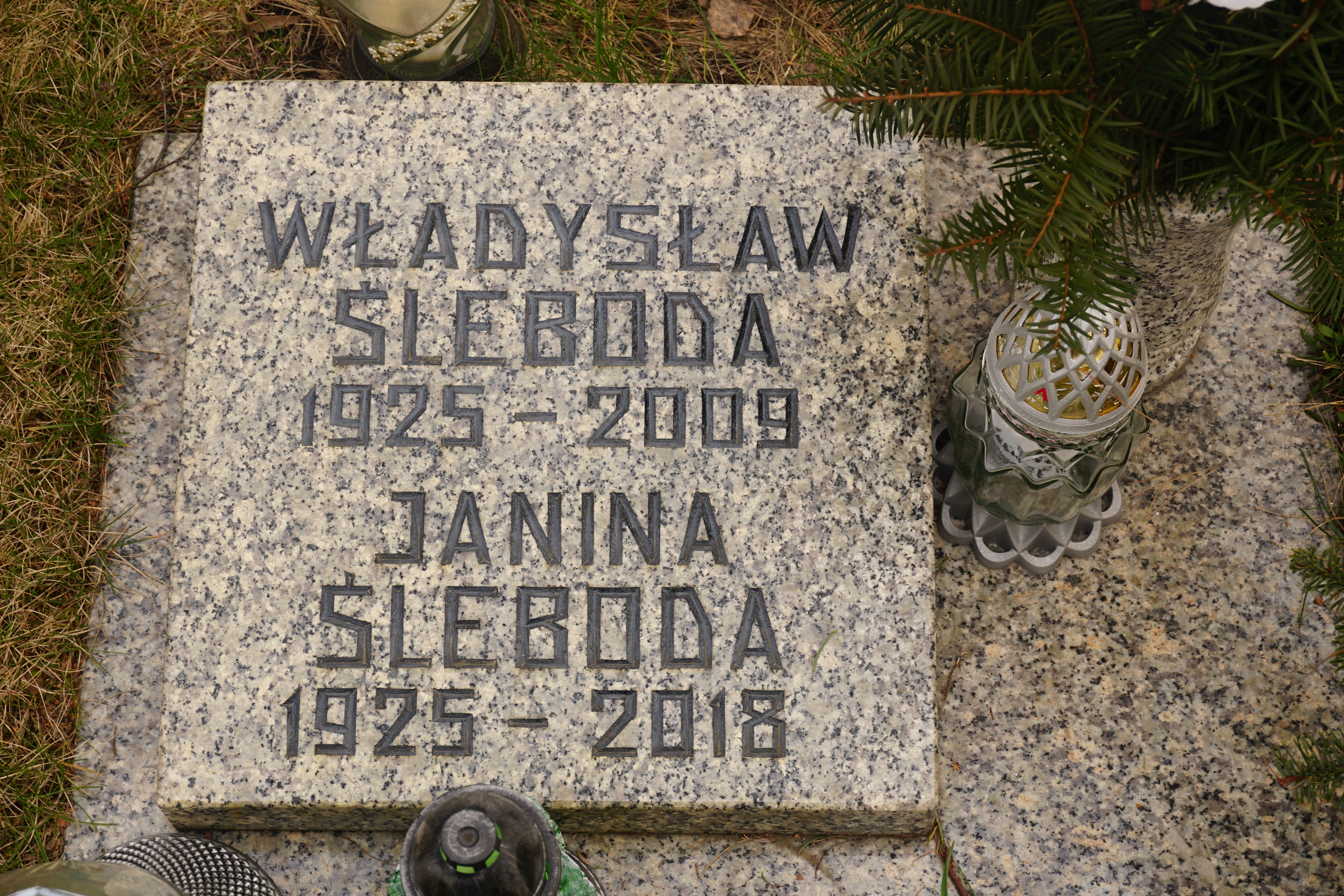
The grave of Władysław Śleboda at the Junikowo Cemetery in Poznań.

Władysław Śleboda was born on 20 June 1925 in Dłużyna, a village now located in the Greater Poland Voivodeship, Poland. In August 1946, he joined the Polish Workers' Party, which on 14 December 1948 merged with the Polish Socialist Party, forming the Polish United Workers' Party. It was disbanded in 1990.

Śleboda attended lectures at the Central Party School of the Polish United Workers' Party in Warsaw from 1956 to 1957, and at the Higher School of Social Sciences at the Central Committee of the Polish United Workers' Party in Warsaw from 1962 to 1965. He was a board member of the county committees of the Polish United Workers' Party divisions in Konin and Leszno, and the committee of the Poznań Voivodeship. From 1975 to 1981, he was the mayor of Poznań. From 13 December 1981 to 20 January 1982, he was interned during the enactment of martial law in Poland. He was one of a few members of the Polish United Workers' Party who were to be interned in order to give credibility to martial law.

Śleboda died on 22 January 2009 in Poznań at the age of 83, and was buried at the Junikowo Cemetery in Poznań.
