= Osieczna =

Town in Greater Poland Voivodeship, Poland

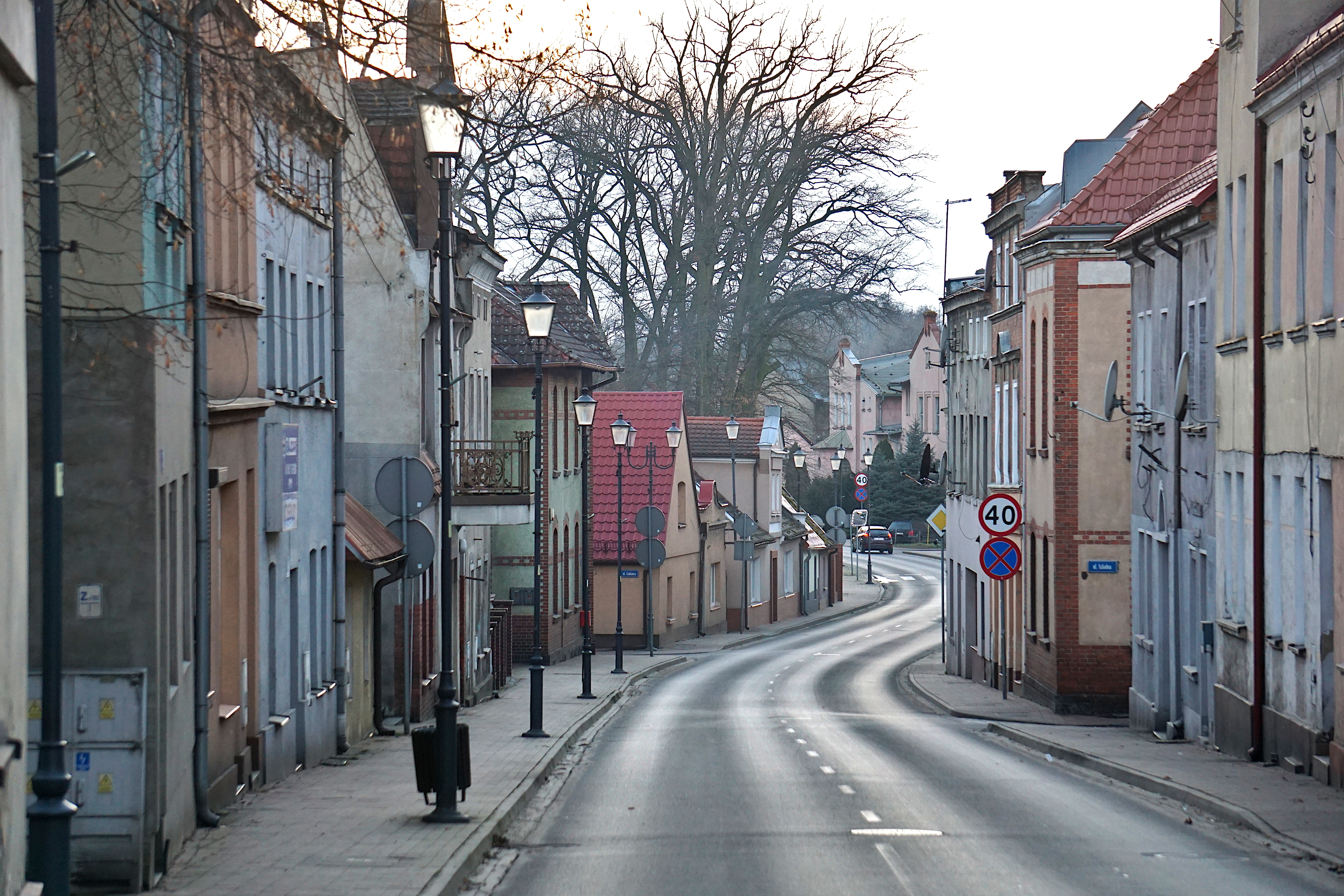
- Town street

- Coat of arms

- Location within Poland
- Coordinates: 51°54′21″N 16°40′35″E
- Country: Poland
- Voivodeship: Greater Poland
- County: Leszno
- Gmina: Osieczna

Area
  - Total: 4.84 km^{2} (1.87 sq mi)

Population (2010)
  - Total: 2,131
  - Density: 440/km^{2} (1,140/sq mi)
- Time zone: UTC+1 (CET)
  - Summer (DST): UTC+2 (CEST)
- Postal code: 64-113
- Vehicle registration: PLE
- Website: http://www.osieczna.pl/

Osieczna [ɔˈɕɛt͡ʂna] is a town in Leszno County, Greater Poland Voivodeship, in western Poland, with 2,131 inhabitants (2010). It is located on the northern shore of the Łoniewskie Lake.

== History ==
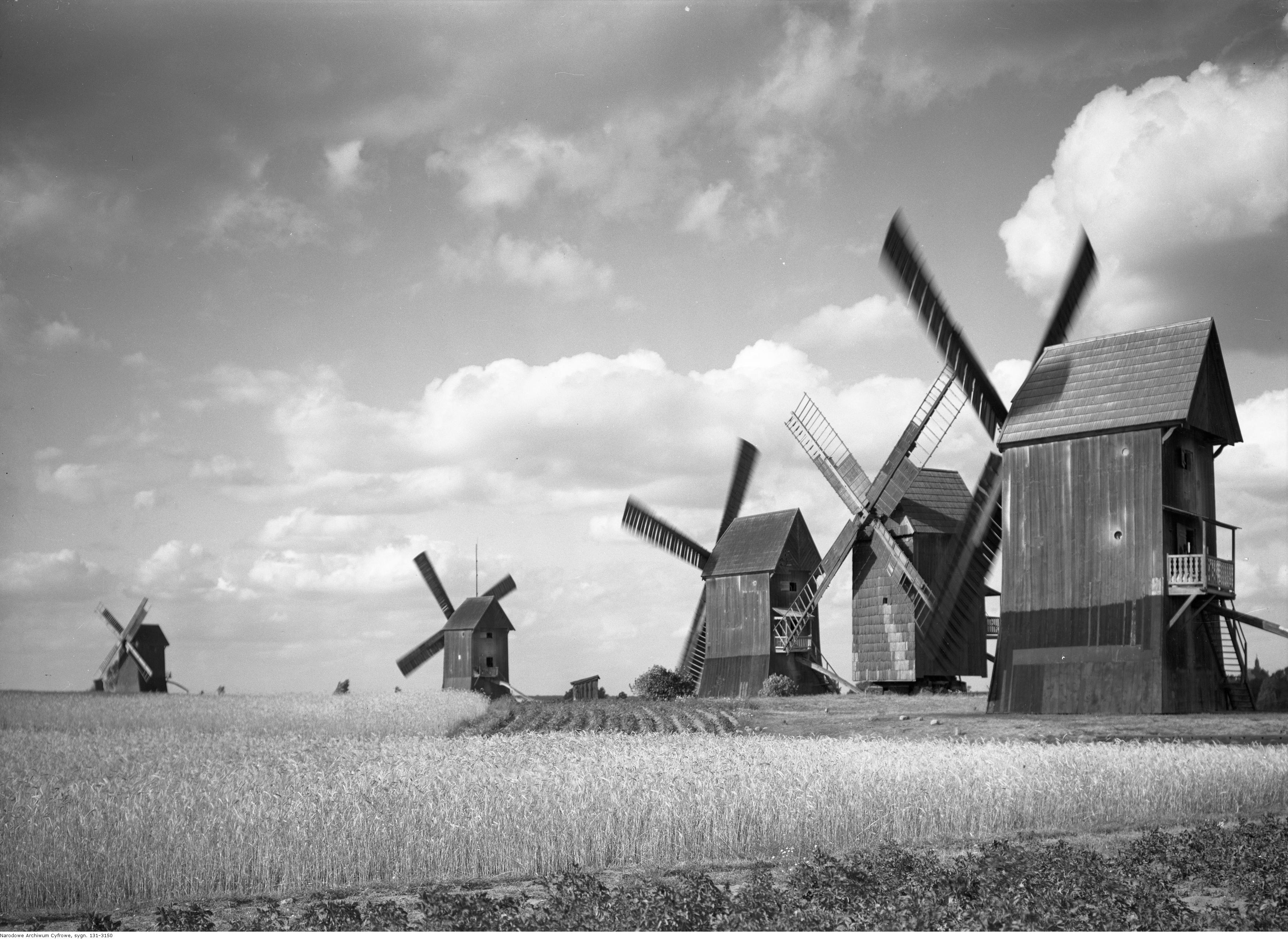
Old post mills in the interbellum

As part of the region of Greater Poland, i.e. the cradle of the Polish state, the area formed part of Poland since its establishment in the 10th century. It was a private town, administratively located in the Kościan County in the Poznań Voivodeship in the Greater Poland Province of the Kingdom of Poland. In the Second Partition of Poland, in 1793, it was annexed by Prussia. Following the successful Greater Poland uprising of 1806, it was included within the short-lived Polish Duchy of Warsaw. After the duchy's dissolution in 1815, it was reannexed by Prussia, and from 1871 it was also part of Germany. The populace was subjected to Germanisation policies.

On January 11, 1919, Osieczna was the site of a victorious battle of the Polish insurgents against the Germans during the Greater Poland uprising, and it was soon reintegrated with Poland, which just regained independence.

Following the German-Soviet invasion of Poland, which started World War II in September 1939, the town was occupied by Germany until 1945. On October 21, 1939, the Germans carried out a public execution of a group of local Poles (see Nazi crimes against the Polish nation). It was one of many massacres of Poles committed by Germany on October 20–23 across the region in attempt to pacify and terrorize the Polish population. Several Poles who were either born or lived and worked in Osieczna were murdered by the Russians in the Katyn massacre in 1940. The German occupation ended in 1945, and the town was restored to Poland, although with a Soviet-installed communist regime, which stayed in power until the Fall of Communism in the 1980s.

In the following years, the Polish anti-communist resistance was active in the town, including the local Underground Scout Organization and Kościuszkowcy organization.

== Transport ==
Osieczna lies on voivodeship road 432.

The nearest railway station is in Leszno.

== Demographics ==
Historical population

Year	Pop.	±%
1880	1,720	—
1890	1,665	−3.2%
1910	1,570	−5.7%
1921	1,559	−0.7%
1931	1,597	+2.4%

Year	Pop.	±%
1939	1,730	+8.3%
1950	1,433	−17.2%
1960	1,590	+11.0%
2010	2,131	+34.0%

== Sights ==
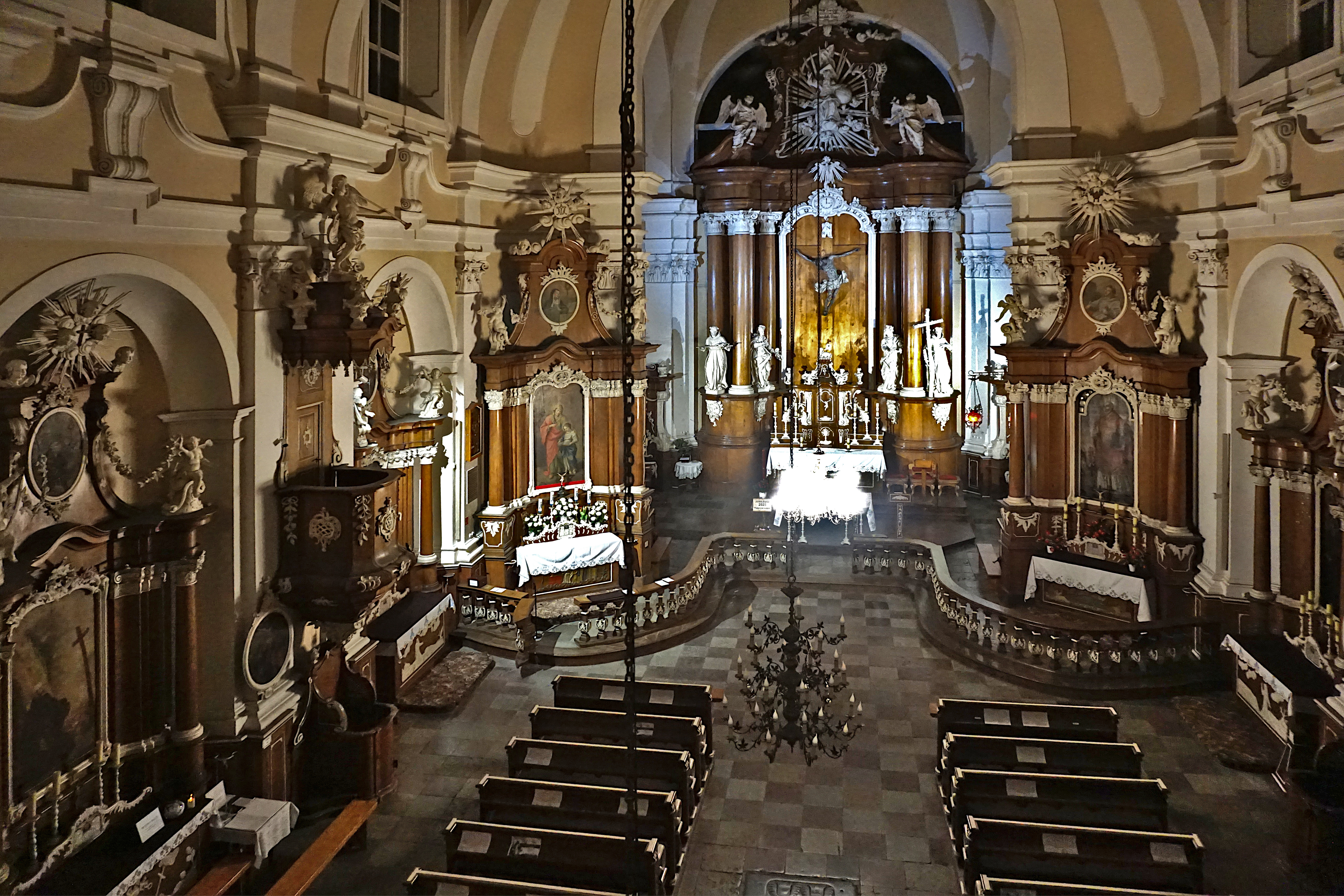
Saint Valentine church interior

- Osieczna Castle
- Gothic-Baroque Holy Trinity church
- Baroque Reformati monastery and Saint Valentine church
- Old post mills
- Rynek (Market Square) filled with historic townhouses
- Monument to the Battle of Osieczna of 1919
