= Gmina Lipno, Greater Poland Voivodeship =

Gmina Lipno Lipno Commune
- Gmina
- Coat of arms
- Interactive map of Gmina Lipno
- Coordinates (Lipno): 51°55′3″N 16°33′36″E
- Country: Poland
- Voivodeship: Greater Poland
- County: Leszno County
- Seat: Lipno

Area
  - Total: 103.43 km^{2} (39.93 sq mi)

Population (2006)
  - Total: 5,720
  - Density: 55.3/km^{2} (143/sq mi)
- Website: http://www.lipno.pl

Gmina Lipno is a rural gmina (administrative district) in Leszno County, Greater Poland Voivodeship, in west-central Poland. Its seat is the village of Lipno, which lies approximately 8 kilometres (5 mi) north of Leszno and 59 km (37 mi) south-west of the regional capital Poznań.

The gmina covers an area of 103.43 square kilometres (39.9 sq mi), and as of 2006 its total population is 5,720.

== Villages ==
Gmina Lipno contains the villages and settlements of Błotkowo, Boża Pomoc, Goniembice, Górka Duchowna, Gronówko, Janopol, Karolewko, Karolówko, Klonówiec, Koronowo, Lipno, Maryszewice, Mórkowo, Radomicko, Ratowice, Smyczyna, Sulejewo, Targowisko, Wilkowice, Wilkowo-Gaj, Wyciążkowo and Żakowo.

== Neighbouring gminas ==
Gmina Lipno is bordered by the city of Leszno and by the gminas of Osieczna, Śmigiel, Święciechowa and Włoszakowice.
