= Bełcz Wielki =

- Village
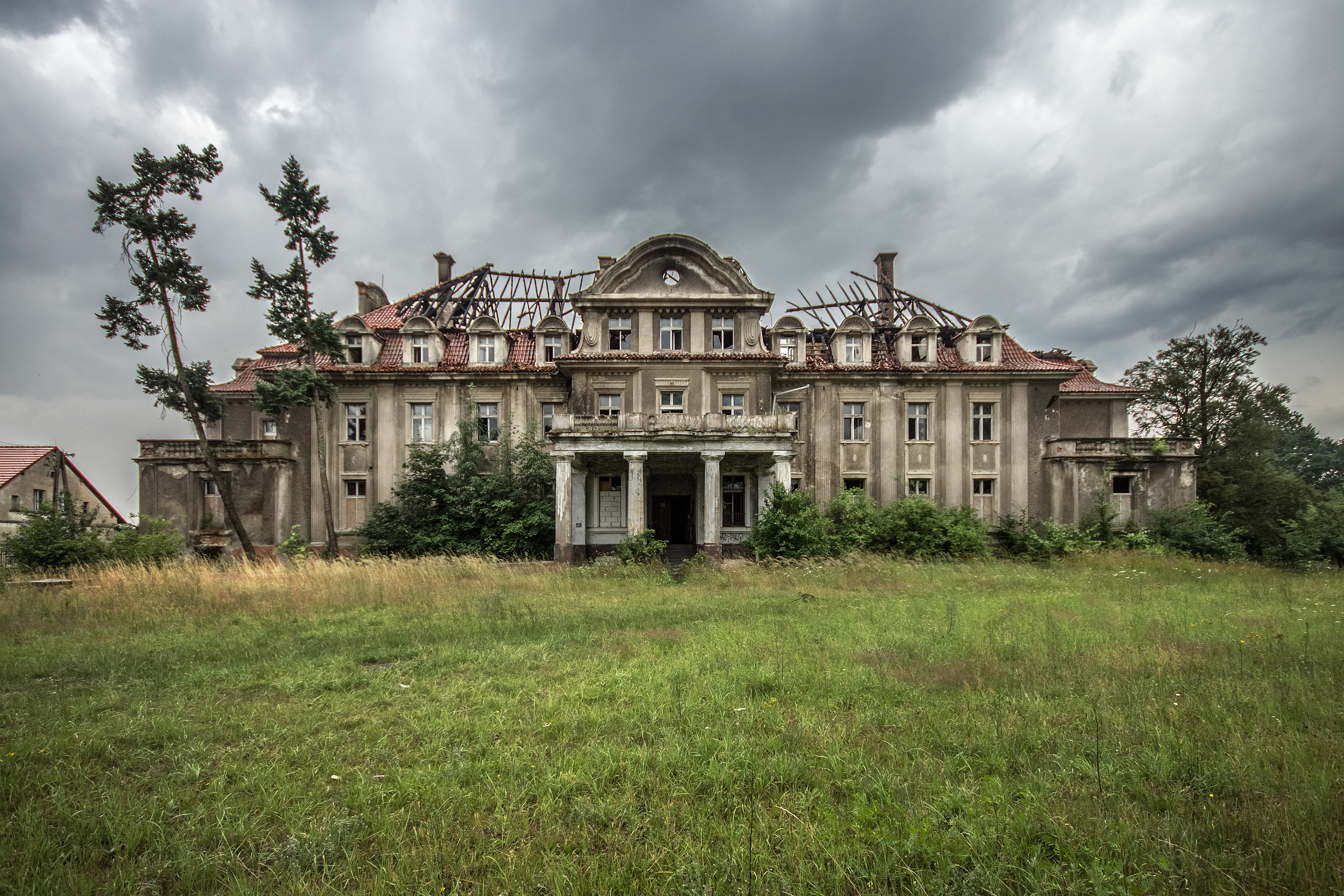
- Palace

- Location within Poland
- Coordinates: 51°37′58″N 16°22′38″E
- Country: Poland
- Voivodeship: Lower Silesian
- County: Góra
- Gmina: Niechlów
- Population: 320
- (approximate)

Bełcz Wielki (Polish pronunciation: [ˈbɛwtʂ ˈfjɛlkʲi]) is a village in the administrative district of Gmina Niechlów, within Góra County, Lower Silesian Voivodeship, in south-western Poland.
