= Stanisław Piotrowicz (1940–2020) =

Polish politician and civil servant (1940–2020)

Mayor of Poznań
- In office 23 February 1981 – 1 June 1982
- Preceded by: Władysław Śleboda
- Succeeded by: Andrzej Wituski

Personal details
- Born: 22 September 1940 Vilnius, Lithuanian SSR, Soviet Union (now part of Lithuania)
- Died: 13 March 2020 (aged 79) Poznań, Poland
- Resting place: Miłostowo Cemetery, Poznań, Poland
- Party: Polish United Workers' Party
- Occupation: Politician, civil servant

Stanisław Mścisław Piotrowicz (Polish: [staˈɲi.swaf ˈmɕt͡ɕi.swaf pjɔˈtrɔ.vit͡ʂ]; 22 September 1940 – 13 March 2020) was a Polish politician and civil servant. From 23 February 1981 to 1 June 1982, he was the mayor of the city of Poznań, Poland.

== Biography ==
Stanisław Piotrowicz was born on 22 September 1940 in the city of Vilnius, then located within the Lithuanian Soviet Socialist Republic in the Soviet Union, and now being part of the Republic of Lithuania. He was a son of Bolesława and Stanisław Piotrowicz.

Piotrowicz was a member of the Polish United Workers' Party. From 23 February 1981 to 1 June 1982, he was the mayor of the city of Poznań, Poland. From 29 January 1984 to 31 December 1989, Piotrowicz was a secretary of the Voivodeship Committee of the Polish United Workers' Party in Poznań Voivodeship.

In 1987, Piotrowicz attended a course at the Institute of Social Sciences of the Central Committee of the Communist Party of the Soviet Union in Moscow in Russian Soviet Socialist Republic.

Piotrowicz died on 13 March 2020 in Poznań, at the age of 79, and was buried at the Miłostowo Cemetery in the city.

== Personal life ==
Piotrowicz had a wife and at least one child.
