= Lipno, Greater Poland Voivodeship =

Lipno
- Village
- Location within Poland
- Coordinates: 51°55′3″N 16°33′36″E
- Country: Poland
- Voivodeship: Greater Poland
- County: Leszno
- Gmina: Lipno
- Population: 1,176

Lipno (Polish pronunciation: [ˈlipnɔ]) is a village in Leszno County, Greater Poland Voivodeship, in west-central Poland. It is the seat of the gmina (administrative district) called Gmina Lipno.
