= Leszno County =

Leszno County Powiat leszczyński
- County
- Coat of arms

- Location within the voivodeship
- Coordinates (Leszno): 51°51′N 16°34′E
- Country: Poland
- Voivodeship: Greater Poland
- Seat: Leszno
- Gminas: Total 7: Gmina Krzemieniewo; Gmina Lipno; Gmina Osieczna; Gmina Rydzyna; Gmina Święciechowa; Gmina Wijewo; Gmina Włoszakowice

Area
  - Total: 804.65 km^{2} (310.68 sq mi)

Population (2021)
  - Total: 58,255
  - Density: 72.398/km^{2} (187.51/sq mi)
  - Urban: 19,273
  - Rural: 38,982
- Car plates: PLE
- Website: www.powiat-leszczynski.pl

Leszno County (Polish: powiat leszczyński) is a unit of territorial administration and local government (powiat) in Greater Poland Voivodeship, west-central Poland. It came into being on January 1, 1999, as a result of the Polish local government reforms passed in 1998. Its administrative seat is the city of Leszno, although the city itself is not part of the county (it constitutes a separate city county). The only towns in Leszno County are Rydzyna, which lies 9 km (6 mi) south-east of Leszno, and Osieczna, 10 km (6 mi) north-east of Leszno.

The county covers an area of 804.65 square kilometres (310.7 sq mi). As of 2021 its total population is 58,255, out of which the population of Rydzyna is 9,962, that of Osieczna is 9,311, and the rural population is 38,982.

== Neighbouring counties ==
Apart from the city of Leszno, Leszno County is also bordered by Kościan County to the north, Gostyń County to the east, Rawicz County to the south-east, Góra County to the south, Wschowa County to the west, and Wolsztyn County to the north-west.

== Administrative divisions ==
The county is subdivided into seven gminas (two urban-rural and five rural). These are listed in the following table, in descending order of population.

Gmina	Type	Area (km^{2})	Population (2021)	Seat
Gmina Włoszakowice	rural	127.2	9,788	Włoszakowice
Gmina Osieczna	urban-rural	128.7	9,311	Osieczna
Gmina Krzemieniewo	rural	113.4	8,255	Krzemieniewo
Gmina Rydzyna	urban-rural	135.6	9,962	Rydzyna
Gmina Święciechowa	rural	135.0	8,265	Święciechowa
Gmina Lipno	rural	103.4	8,814	Lipno
Gmina Wijewo	rural	61.4	3,860	Wijewo
