= Mierzewski family with Ostoja coat of arms =

Polish medieval CoA Ostoja

The Mierzewski (Mirzewscy) family - a Polish noble family with the Ostoja coat of arms, belonging to the heraldic Clan Ostoja (Moscics). They come from the Popowski coat of arms Ostoja z Popowo, located in the former district of Kościan of Poznań voivodeship. The Mierzewski family took their surname from the village of Mirzewo (sometimes Mierzewo, now Mierzejewo), located in the former district of Kościan of Poznań voivodeship.

== The oldest source certificates concerning the family ==
Listed below are selected source certificates concerning the Mierzewski family of the Ostoja coat of arms and the nesting villages of Popowo and Mirzewo until the mid-16th century.

- The earliest, known mention of the village of Popowo comes from 1361, when King Kazimierz announced that Dominik, the heir from Popowo, proved that his father-in-law had received the royal village of Żerniki, located in the territory of Pyzdry, from King Władysław Łokietek.
- The village of Mirzewo was first mentioned in 1310. At that time, Henry, the Duke of Greater Poland and Głogów, established a district in Poniec (its borders were to include Mirzewo).
- In 1510 brothers: Łukasz, Jan and Stanisław, sons of the deceased Jan of Popówo, performed.
- In the years 1511-1512 brothers: Łukasz, Jan and Stanisław, sons of the late Jan of Popówo, made bequests for their wives (on hereditary parts in Popowo). In 1511 Łukasz Popowski bequeathed 25 zlotys to his wife Katarzyna, daughter of the deceased Stanisław Pigłowski, and 25 zlotys of a dowry. That year, his brother Jan wrote down a dowry of 60 and a dowry of 60 to his wife Anna, daughter of Maciej Sepieński. A year later, the third of the Popowski brothers, Stanisław, bequeathed 25 fines for a dowry and 25 fines for a dowry to wife Agnieszka, the daughter of Stanisław Poświątny.
- In 1529 Łukasz Popowski bought from Jerzy Rogaczewski for 600 fines. That year, the same Łukasz Popowski gave 1/2 of Mirzewo to Katarzyna Pigłowska's wife in life imprisonment.
- In 1536, Łukasz Mirzewski (Popowski) and his wife Katarzyna Pigłowska sold (subject to the right of repurchase) 1/2 Mirzewo for 100 fines to Jan Ujezdzki.

== The estates belonging to the family ==
The most important land properties belonging to the Mierzewski family with Ostoja coat of arms are listed below.

Popowo, Mirzewo (Mierzejewo), Czarnotki, Kępa, Nowa Wieś, Nądnia, Sulęcin, Borowo, Kociugi, Żółków, Kaczki Pośrednie, Oborzyska.

== Family representatives ==
- Łukasz Popowski (sometimes Mirzewski) (died before 1547) - heir of the properties in Popowo and Mirzewo. He was the son of Jan of Popówo. His spouse was Katarzyna Pigłowska. In 1529 he sold his department in Popowo to Piotr Bojanowski for 400 fines. That year he bought land in Mirzewo from Jerzy Rogaczewski for 600 fines. He was sometimes called Mirzewski from these properties. His descendants used this surname, which was initially spelled Mirzewski, then Mierzewski.
- Stanisław Popowski (sometimes Mirzewski) (died before 1559) - landowner in Mirzewo. He was the son of Łukasz and Katarzyna Pigłowska. His wife was Anna Kemblanówna Chełkowska, daughter of Wincenty, widow of Jan Chociszewski, who was framed as a dowry in half of Mirzewo in the amount of 200 fines in 1551.
- Abraham Mierzewski née Popowo (died after 1606) - Catholic priest, parish priest in Goniembice and Śmigiel, dean of the collegiate church in Szamotuły, heir of a part in Mirzewo. He was the son of Stanisław and Anna née Chełkowski.
- Eustachy of Popów Mierzewski (died after 1613) - heir of a part in Mirzewo. The son of Stanisław and Anna Chełkowska. After his father's death, in 1559 he was under the care of his uncles, Piotr, Maciej and Mateusz Popowski. His wife was Dorota Gnińska, whom he framed a dowry of 800 zlotys on half of his parts in Mierzewo in 1574. His brother was Abraham Mierzewski, the dean of Szamotuły.
- Andrzej of Popówo Mierzewski (died 1617) - Catholic priest, parish priest in Pobiedziska, canon of the Poznań cathedral chapter in the years 1614–1617. He was the son of Eustachy, the heir of some of the Mirzewo and Dorota Gnińska properties. According to Niesiecki, he was a theologian of the Archbishop of Gniezno, Wojciech Baranowski.
- Stanisław of Popów Mierzewski (died after 1624) - heir of part of Mirzewo, owner of parts in Kociugi, Pawłowice and Popowo. Son of Eustachy and Dorota Gnińska. In 1609 he bought parts from Mikołaj Popowski in the village of Kociugi for PLN 3,600. In 1617, he purchased an oak forest in Pawłowice for 200 zlotys. A year later, he bought parts in Popowo for PLN 5,000. He purchased a part of Mierzewski from his brother Jan Mierzewski in 1622. His first wife was Anna Kurnatowska, Jakub's daughter. Mierzewski's second wife was Małgorzata Rutkowska, Stanisław's daughter.
- Jan of Popówo Mierzewski (died after 1631) - heir of a part of Mirzewo, owner of land estates in the villages of: Czarnotki, Kępa, Nowa Wieś, Nądnia, Sulęcin, Borowo and others. He was the son of Eustachy and Dorota Gnińska. His spouse was Anna Pudliszkowska, daughter of Jerzy, widow of Piotr Bronikowski. Jan and Anna Mierzewski had a sharp dispute with the heirs of Piotr Bronikowski. The servants of Jan Mierzewski invaded the manor house in Broników, for which a protest was lodged in 1609. Anna née Pudliszkowska Mierzewska, on her part, accused Jan Bronikowski, her first husband's brother, of seizing the jewels and robes under the guise of taking care of his nephews.
- Eustachy Mierzewski (died after 1651) - the owner of Gierłyówo and some of them in Mirzewo and Gostków. He was the son of Stanisław and Anna Kurnatowska. His first wife was Anna from Szurków Gostkowska, daughter of Mikołaj, and the second was Katarzyna Kunińska, daughter of Mikołaj.
- Wojciech Ignacy Mierzewski (born 1648) - the owner of parts of Mirzewo, Brelewo, Kociug, Żółkówa. He was the son of Eustachy and Katarzyna Kunińska. His wife was Agnieszka Kąkolewska.
- Stanisław Jakub Mierzewski (born 1651) - owner of parts of Mirzewo, Brelewo and Kociug. He was the son of Eustachy and Katarzyna Kunińska. His first wife was Jadwiga née Gryżyna Mąkowska (sometimes Gryżyńska), the daughter of Grzegorz and Teresa née Karchowska. Mierzewski's second wife was Marianna Daleszyńska, daughter of Franciszek and Zofia née Falęcka, widow of Andrzej Goczałkowski.
- Michał Krystyn Mierzewski (born 1706) - heir of a part in Kociugi, owner of half of the Kaczki Posredni, mortgagee owner of a part of the village of Paprotnia, leaseholder of Wyganki. He was signed by Michał Ostoja Mierzewski. He was the son of Stanisław and Marianna Daleszyńska. He got married three times. He married Petronella Szczytnicka for the first time, Marianna Jackowska (daughter of Jan, Kruszwicki and Teresa née Załustowska) for the second time, and Marianna Skrzetuska (daughter of Antoni and Katarzyna née Gałczyńska) for the third time.
- Franciszek Mierzewski (died before 1770) - heir of the part in Kociugi called Mały Dwór. He was the son of Stanisław and Marianna Daleszyńska. In 1731 he married Tarsilla Niesiołowska, the daughter of Stanisław and Justyna Linowska, whom in 1741 he had a dowry of 10,700 zlotys.
- Józef Walerian Aleksander Mierzewski (born 1731) - a Catholic priest, parish priest in Oborzyska in 1770. He was the son of Franciszek and Tarsilla Niesiołowska. He was already dead in 1790.
- Andrzej Mikołaj Feliks Mierzewski (born 1735) - landowner in Kociugi, owner of half of Oborzyska. He was the son of Franciszek and Tarsilla Niesiołowska. His wife was Józefata Rościeska. In 1778 he bought it from Antoni Goczałkowski, acting as the plenipotentiary of Stanisław's brother, the burgrave of Kraków, for 60,000 zlotys. half of Oborzyska in the area Kosciański.

== See also ==
- Ostoja CoA
- Clan Ostoja (Moscics)

== Bibliography ==
- Teki Dworzaczka. Materiały historyczno-genealogiczne do dziejów szlachty wielkopolskiej XV-XX w., Biblioteka Kórnicka PAN, Kórnik-Poznań 1995-2019 - Monografie - Mierzewscy, Mirzewscy h. Ostoja - Teki Dworzaczka.
- T. Jurek (red.), Słownik historyczno-geograficzny ziem polskich w średniowieczu, Instytut Historii Polskiej Akademii Nauk, 2010–2019, Poznań, część III, s. 168–171, 778–781.
- Z. Cieplucha, Z przeszłości ziemi Kościańskiej, Kościan 1929, s. 217.
- K. Niesiecki, Herbarz polski, wyd. J.N. Bobrowicz, Lipsk 1839–1845, t. VI s. 403.
- W. J. Skowroński, Rody szlacheckie w Wielkopolsce w XVI – XIX w., Biblioteka Poznańskiego Towarzystwa Przyjaciół Nauk, litera M, s. 112–115.
