= Witold Dzierżykraj-Morawski =

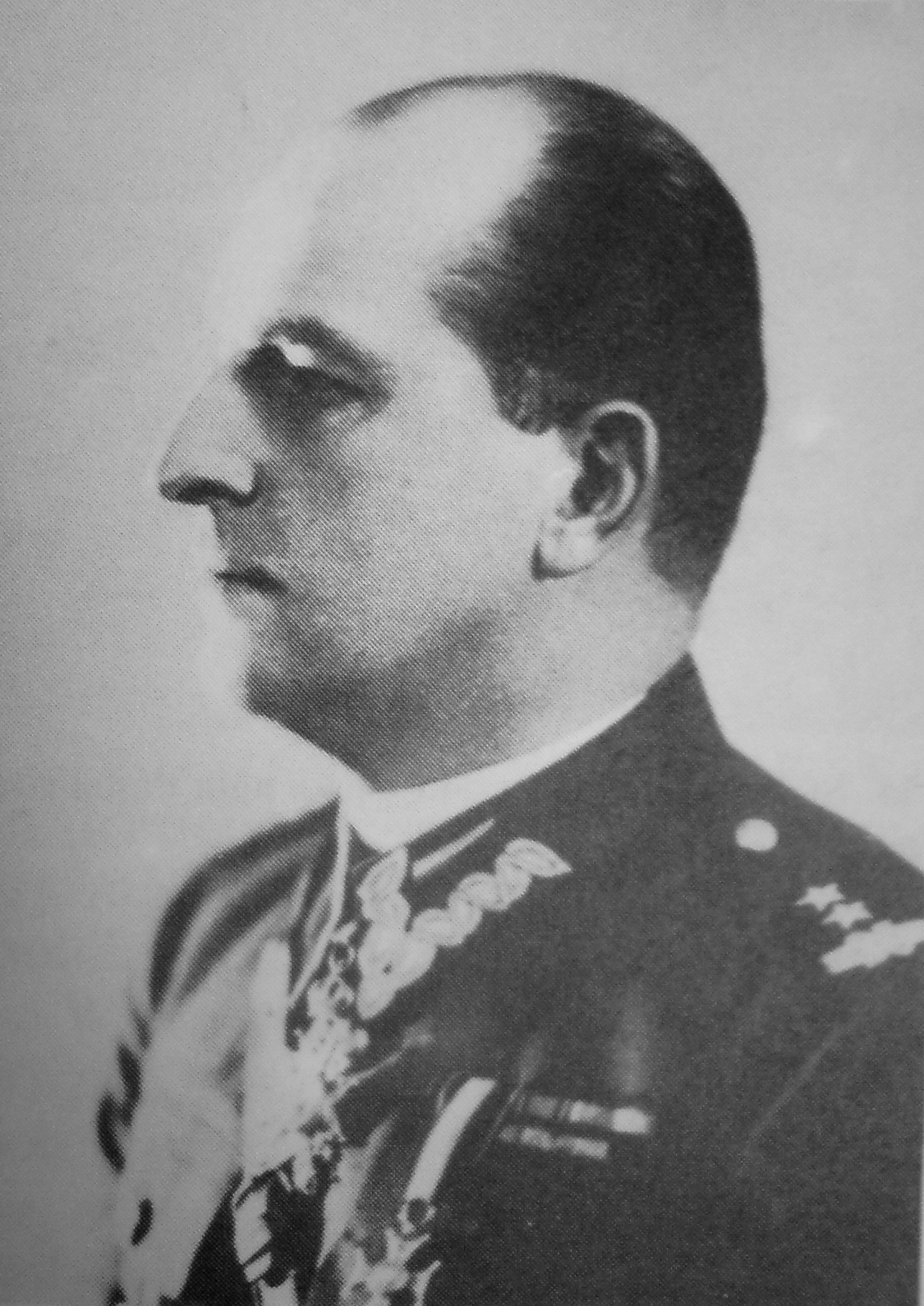
- Born: 1895; Oporowo, Province of Posen, German Empire
- Died: 1944 (aged 49); Mauthausen-Gusen concentration camp
- Military career
- Allegiance: German Empire (1914–1918); Poland (1918–1944)
- Branch: Cavalry
- Service years: 1914–1944
- Rank: Generał brygady (Posthumous)
- Known for: Leader of underground POW resistance in Oflag II-D
- Conflicts: World War I Greater Poland Uprising Polish–Bolshevik War World War II (Polish Defensive War)

Witold Józef Dzierżykraj-Morawski (1895–1944) was a Polish military commander, diplomat and a Colonel of the Polish Army.

Witold Dzierżykraj-Morawski was born in 1895 in his family's manor in Oporowo near Krzemieniewo, Province of Posen, German Empire. At the age of 15 he inherited the manor and the surrounding village. As a German citizen, after the outbreak of the Great War he was drafted into the Imperial German army. Promoted to officer's grade, in December 1918 he joined the newly reborn Polish Army. A field commander during the Greater Poland Uprising, during the Polish-Bolshevik War he became the chief of staff of the Polish 7th Cavalry Brigade.

Between 1923 and 1926 he served as the military attaché in the Polish embassy in Bucharest. Upon his return he briefly served as one of the commanding officers of the Prużana-based Polish 17th Uhlans Regiment. In 1928 he resumed his post as a military attaché, this time in Berlin. He held that post until 1932. Until 1937 he was the commanding officer of the Polish 25th Uhlans Regiment and one of the staff officers of the Lwów-based Army Inspectorate. During the Polish mobilization prior to the outbreak of the Polish Defensive War he became the chief of staff of the Karpaty Army. During the campaign he also held the same rank within the Małopolska Army.

Taken prisoner of war by the Germans, he spent the remainder of World War II in various German POW camps, including Oflag VII-C in Laufen, Oflag XI-B in Brunswick, Oflag II-C in Woldenberg and Oflag II-B in Arnswalde. Transferred to the Oflag II-D in Gross-Born, he was the highest-ranking officer there and the informal commander of all the allied prisoners held there. He also became the lead organizer of an underground organization there, intending to prepare an escape of the prisoners. Handed over to the Gestapo, he was imprisoned in the Mauthausen-Gusen concentration camp, where he died.

In 1964, he was posthumously promoted to the rank of generał brygady.
