= Magnates of Poland and Lithuania =

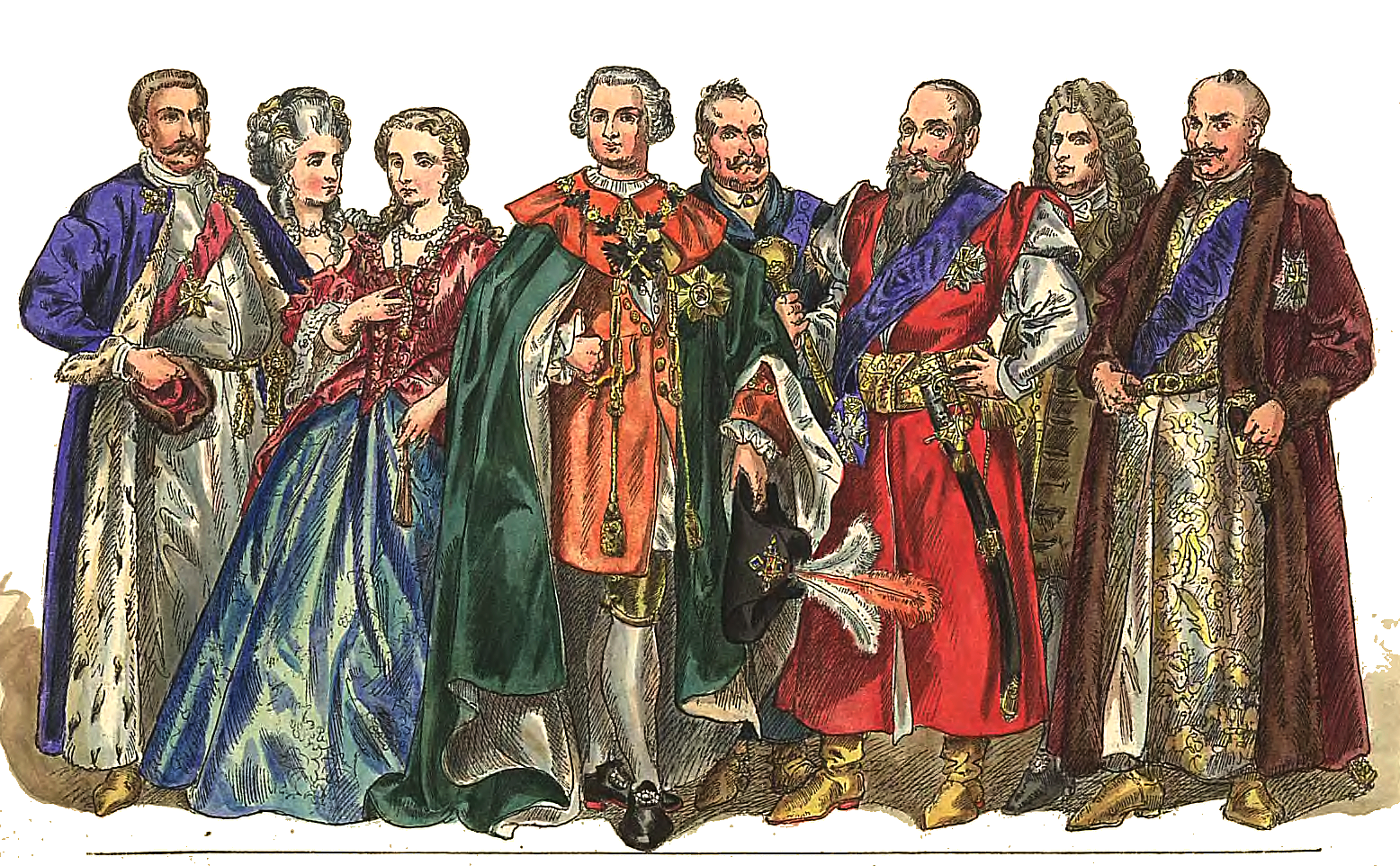
Painting, by Jan Matejko, of Polish magnates (1697–1795). See their names here.

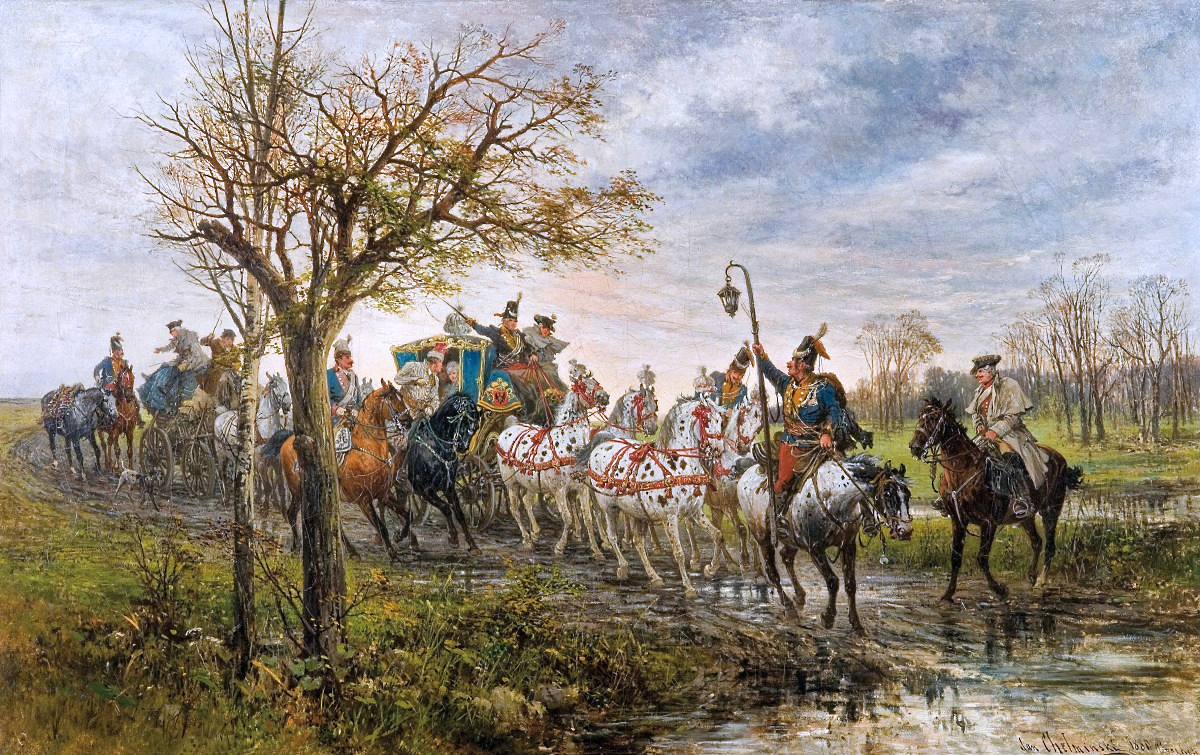
A Polish lord's journey during the reign of King August III, by Jan Chełmiński, 1880

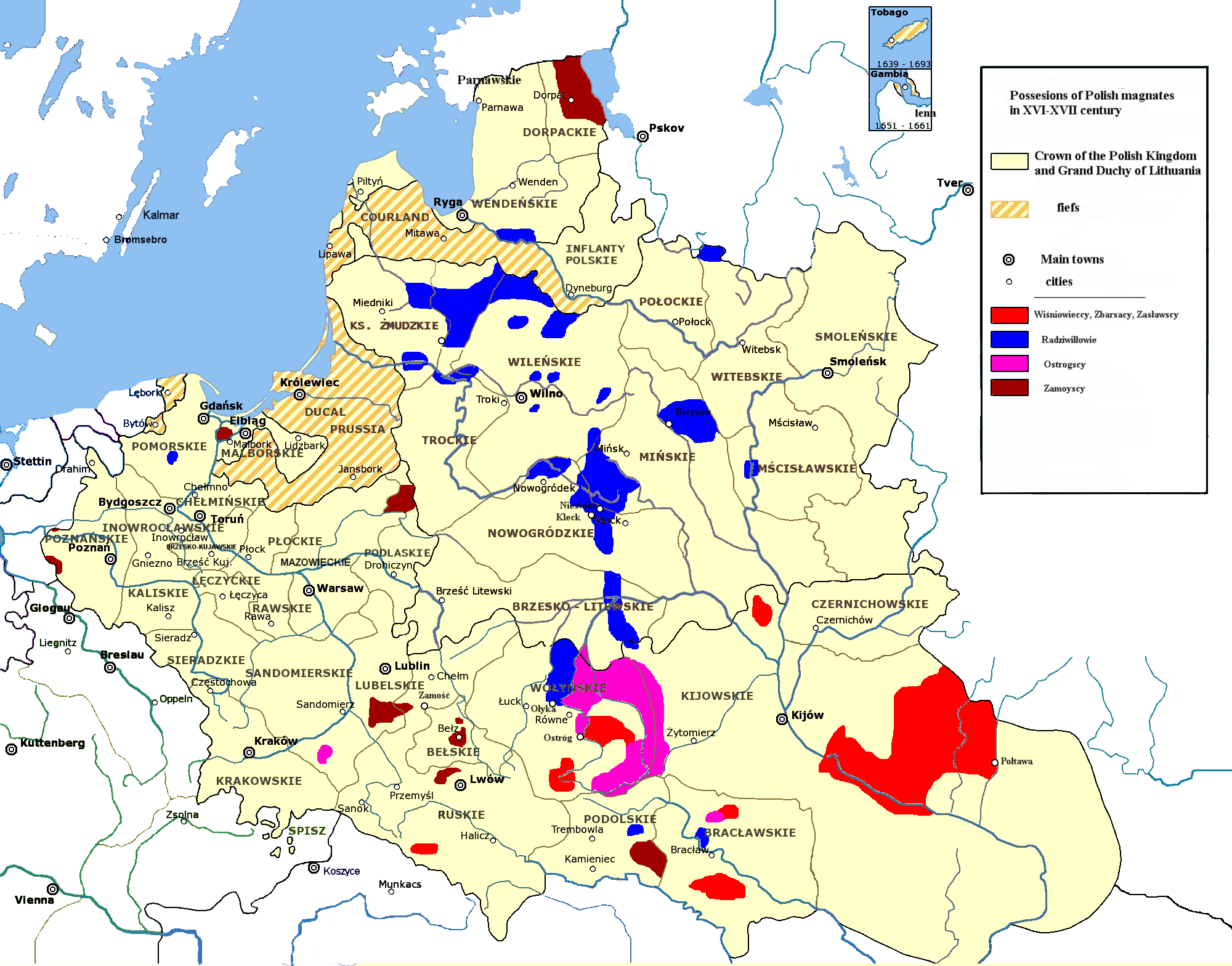
Possessions of Polish-Lithuanian magnates in 16th–17th centuries

The magnates of Poland and Lithuania (Polish: magnateria, Lithuanian: magnatai) were an aristocracy of Polish-Lithuanian nobility (szlachta) that existed in the Crown of the Kingdom of Poland, in the Grand Duchy of Lithuania and, from the 1569 Union of Lublin, in the Polish–Lithuanian Commonwealth, until the Third Partition of Poland in 1795.

The magnate social class arose around the 16th century and, over time, gained more and more control over Commonwealth politics. The most powerful magnates were known as "little kings" due to the extent of their power and independence. Their influence diminished with the Third Partition of Poland (1795), which ended the Commonwealth's independent existence, and came to an end with the Second World War and the communist-ruled People's Republic of Poland.

Famous magnate families in the territories of the Crown of Poland included the Czartoryski, Kalinowski, Koniecpolski, Krasinski, Ostrogski, Potocki, Tarnowski, Wiśniowiecki, Zasławski and Zamoyski families; and in the Grand Duchy of Lithuania, the Kieżgajłow, Olelkowicz, Radziwiłł, Pac and Sapieha families.

== History and characteristics ==
The magnates arose as the wealthiest and most politically powerful social class, part of the nobility (szlachta), of the Kingdom of Poland and Grand Duchy of Lithuania, around 16th century. Some traced their ancestry to Gediminas, a Grand Duke of Lithuania from 1316, the Gediminids. Their powers waned after the Commonwealth loss of independence following its final partition in 1795, but they would remain a significant power in the culture, politics and economy of the Polish territories until World War II.

Magnates (or higher nobility) vied for political power with the lesser and middle nobility (Ruch egzekucyjny in the late 16th century, and the reform movement of the Great Sejm in the late 18th century) and the King. To be counted among the magnates, one should have a large estate, and political influence at least on the scale of a province, if not national. Regional differences abounded, with the estates being much larger in the east, where the wealthier magnates were also much more likely to have their own private armies. The eastern territories were more independent from the central power, and the large estates there, known as latifundia, with private cities and armies of the magnates, gave rise there to the term królewięta ("little kings") used for the wealthiest of them - the developing aristocracy. The magnates in the Royal Prussia had their fortunes build not around their own lands, but the royal grants (królewszczyzny). The magnates tried to avoid splitting up of their lands, and some of the wealthiest families were able to protect their lands from division through the ordynacja system. Magnate residences often became cultural and economic centers for a given region.

Social mobility was present, in a limited fashion, as while the magnates preferred to marry within their own ranks, particularly wealthy of famous lesser nobles were able to join their ranks over time; this was the case with the Koniecpolski family, Ossoliński family and the Zamoyski family.

From the late 16th century the influence of the magnates on Commonwealth politics rose sharply, through their participation in the administrative system (see offices of the Polish–Lithuanian Commonwealth) and their control over the lesser nobility, which allowed them to influence the parliaments (local sejmiks and the national sejm walny) of the country. From the second half of the 17th century, the magnates emerged as the victors in the struggle for power in the Polish–Lithuanian Commonwealth, leading some scholar to refer to this period as a time of the magnate oligarchy. As Norman Davies noted, at that time "political life [of Poland] was reduced to the feuds, fortunes, and the follies of a few families". Faced with the weakness of the king and parliament, the magnates were even able on occasion to start border wars (Magnate Moldavian Wars, the Dimitriads) or civil wars (Radziwiłł's rebellion during The Deluge, and the Sapieha's-centered Lithuanian Civil War of 1700). Some magnates were also elected as kings of the Commonwealth; namely Michał Korybut Wiśniowiecki and Stanisław August Poniatowski (a relative of the Czartoryski family).

All members of the szlachta were equal under the law, therefore "magnate" (Polish: magnat, Lithuanian: magnatas) was not an official title but rather a position of social class, based on wealth. Several magnates held high feudal titles or peerage ranks such as prince or count. With few exceptions, mostly dating from the Union of Lublin, and special privileges permitting some Lithuanian magnates to use them, such titles were forbidden by law. Titles from the offices in Polish–Lithuanian Commonwealth however were very popular.

The wealthiest of magnates would wear crimson and scarlet items of clothing, leading to a nickname for that elite group, karmazyni (the "crimson ones").

== Families ==
Famous magnate families from the Crown of Poland territories included: the Czartoryski, Wielopolski, Kalinowski, Koniecpolski, Ossoliński, Ostrogski, Potocki, Wiśnowiecki, Zasławski, Zamoyski, Krasiński, Mielżyński, and Branicki families.

From the Grand Duchy of Lithuania, notable families included: the Alšėniškis, Astikai, Goštautai, Kęsgaila, Manvydas, Olelkovich, Pac, Radziwiłł, Sapieha, and Tyszkiewicz families.

== Residences ==
Major magnate residences, usually in the form of dwórs or dvaras and even outright palaces were found in: Pawłowice, Iwno, Biržai, Kėdainiai, Nesvizh, Slutsk, Kletsk, Slonim, Białystok, Sieraków, Leszno, Rydzyna, Gołuchów, Bieżuń, Jabłonna, Siedlce, Nieborów, Otwock, Pawłowice, Iwno, Vowchyn (Voŭčyn), Biała, Kodeń, Puławy, Białaczów, Końskie, Ujazd, Opole, Rytwiany, Baranów, Zamość, Chervonohrad, Łańcut, Ruzhany, Przeworsk, Zhovkva, Wiśnicz, Rzeszów, Dukla, Krasiczyn, Ivano-Frankivsk, Zolochiv, Brody, Pidhirtsi, Vyshnivets, Olyka, Korets, Ostroh, Iziaslav, Buchach, Zbarazh, Bila Tserkva, Sieniawa, Korsun-Shevchenkivskyi and Tulchyn.

== See also ==
- List of szlachta (this article lists the families of the magnate class, or higher nobility).
- Golden Liberty
- Polish heraldry
- Sarmatism
- Princely Houses of Poland
- Paradisus Judaeorum
