= Pawłowice =

Pawłowice may refer to the following places in Poland:

- Pawłowice (palace)
- Pawłowice, Lower Silesian Voivodeship, (south-west Poland)
- Pawłowice, Łódź Voivodeship, (central Poland)
- Pawłowice, Lublin Voivodeship, (east Poland)
- Pawłowice, Jędrzejów County, in Świętokrzyskie Voivodeship (south-central Poland)
- Pawłowice, Pińczów County, in Świętokrzyskie Voivodeship (south-central Poland)
- Pawłowice, Grójec County, in Masovian Voivodeship (east-central Poland)
- Pawłowice, Lipsko County, in Masovian Voivodeship (east-central Poland)
- Pawłowice, Piaseczno County, in Masovian Voivodeship (east-central Poland)
- Pawłowice, Sochaczew County, in Masovian Voivodeship (east-central Poland)
- Pawłowice, Żyrardów County, in Masovian Voivodeship (east-central Poland)
- Pawłowice, Jarocin County, in Greater Poland Voivodeship (west-central Poland)
- Pawłowice, Leszno County, in Greater Poland Voivodeship (west-central Poland)
- Pawłowice, Poznań County, in Greater Poland Voivodeship (west-central Poland)
- Pawłowice, Gliwice County, in Silesian Voivodeship (south Poland)
- Pawłowice, Pszczyna County, in Silesian Voivodeship (south Poland)
- Pawłowice, Wrocław, a district of Wrocław
- Pawłowice Namysłowskie
- Pawłowice Wielkie
