= Gmina Krzemieniewo =

Gmina Krzemieniewo Krzemieniewo Commune
- Gmina
- Flag Coat of arms
- Interactive map of Gmina Krzemieniewo
- Coordinates (Krzemieniewo): 51°51′29″N 16°49′44″E
- Country: Poland
- Voivodeship: Greater Poland
- County: Leszno County
- Seat: Krzemieniewo

Area
  - Total: 113.44 km^{2} (43.80 sq mi)

Population (2006)
  - Total: 8,474
  - Density: 74.70/km^{2} (193.5/sq mi)
- Website: http://www.krzemieniewo.pl

Gmina Krzemieniewo is a rural gmina (administrative district) in Leszno County, Greater Poland Voivodeship, in west-central Poland. Its seat is the village of Krzemieniewo, which lies approximately 19 kilometres (12 mi) east of Leszno and 61 km (38 mi) south of the regional capital Poznań.

The gmina covers an area of 113.44 square kilometres (43.8 sq mi), and as of 2006 its total population is 8,474.

== Villages ==
Gmina Krzemieniewo contains the villages and settlements of Bielawy, Bojanice, Brylewo, Czarny Las, Drobnin, Garzyn, Górzno, Grabówiec, Granicznik, Hersztupowo, Kałowo, Karchowo, Kociugi, Krzemieniewo, Lubonia, Mały Dwór, Mierzejewo, Nadolnik, Nowy Belęcin, Oporówko, Oporowo, Pawłowice, Stary Belęcin, Wygoda and Zbytki.

== Neighbouring gminas ==
Gmina Krzemieniewo is bordered by the gminas of Gostyń, Krzywiń, Osieczna, Poniec and Rydzyna.
