= Granicznik, Greater Poland Voivodeship =

Granicznik
- Settlement
- Location within Poland
- Coordinates: 51°50′51″N 16°43′04″E
- Country: Poland
- Voivodeship: Greater Poland
- County: Leszno
- Gmina: Krzemieniewo

Granicznik [ɡraˈɲit͡ʂɲik] is a settlement in the administrative district of Gmina Krzemieniewo, within Leszno County, Greater Poland Voivodeship, in west-central Poland.
