= Czarny Las, Greater Poland Voivodeship =

Czarny Las
- Settlement
- Location within Poland
- Coordinates: 51°55′14″N 16°51′12″E
- Country: Poland
- Voivodeship: Greater Poland
- County: Leszno
- Gmina: Krzemieniewo

Czarny Las [ˈt͡ʂarnɨ ˈlas] is a settlement in the administrative district of Gmina Krzemieniewo, within Leszno County, Greater Poland Voivodeship, in west-central Poland.
