= Kościan =

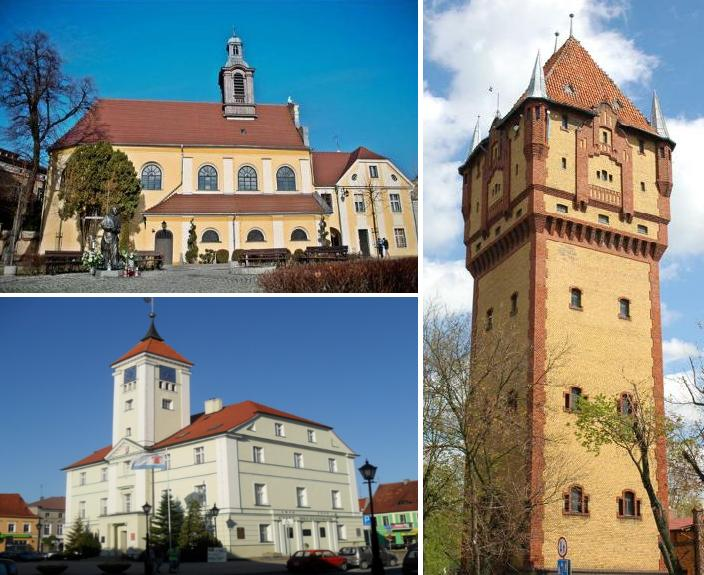
- Christ Church, Town Hall and Water Tower

- Flag Coat of arms

- Location within Poland
- Coordinates: 52°5′N 16°39′E
- Country: Poland
- Voivodeship: Greater Poland
- County: Kościan
- Gmina: Kościan (urban gmina)
- Established: 12th century
- Town rights: 13th century

Government
  - Mayor: Sławomir Kaczmarek (PO)

Area
  - Total: 8.75 km^{2} (3.38 sq mi)
- Highest elevation: 85 m (279 ft)
- Lowest elevation: 75 m (246 ft)

Population (2014)
  - Total: 23,952
  - Density: 2,740/km^{2} (7,090/sq mi)
- Time zone: UTC+1 (CET)
  - Summer (DST): UTC+2 (CEST)
- Postal code: 64-000
- Area code: +48 65
- Car plates: PKS
- Website: http://www.koscian.pl

Kościan ([ˈkɔɕt͡ɕan]) (German: Kosten) is a town on the Obra canal in west-central Poland, with a population of 23,952 inhabitants as of June 2014. Situated in the Greater Poland Voivodeship, it is the capital of Kościan County.

== History ==
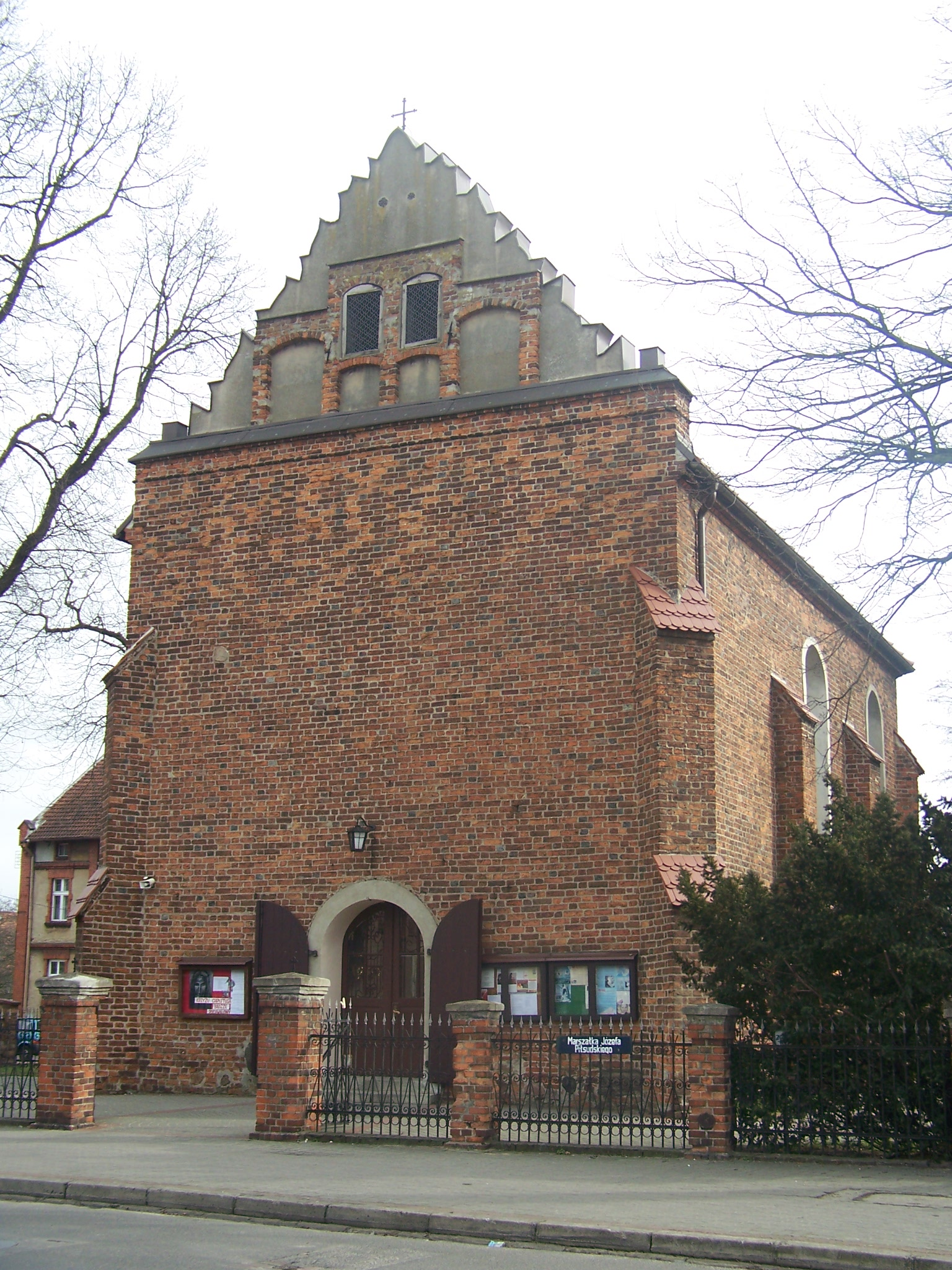
Gothic Holy Spirit Church

Kościan was founded in the 12th or 13th century, when it was part of the Duchy of Greater Poland of the fragmented Polish realm. It was granted town rights in the second half of the 13th century, which were later confirmed by King Władysław Jagiełło in 1400. From 1332 Kościan was a royal town of Poland. It was a county (powiat) seat in the Poznań Voivodeship in the Greater Poland Province. In the 15th century Kościan was famous for its cloth production. King Casimir IV Jagiellon granted Kościan cloths the first industrial trademark in the history of Poland. At the time Kościan was the second largest city within historic Greater Poland (behind Poznań).

Kościan was captured by the Swedes during the Swedish invasion of Poland (the Swedish Deluge) in 1655, but was soon recaptured by a partisan unit led by Krzysztof Żegocki. The town suffered from further Swedish and Russian invasions in the 18th century. The 2nd Polish National Cavalry Brigade was stationed in Kościan. Kościan was annexed by Prussia in the Second Partition of Poland in 1793. The Polish Greater Poland uprising of 1794 began in Kościan. After the successful Greater Poland uprising of 1806, it was regained by Poles and included with the short-lived Duchy of Warsaw. The 12th Polish Infantry Regiment was formed in Kościan in 1806. In 1815 it was reannexed by Prussia. In 1918, Poland regained independence, and shortly afterwards the Greater Poland uprising broke out, which goal was to reunite the town and region with the reborn Polish state. On 29–30 December 1918, local Polish scouts stole more than 900 machine guns, rifles and pistols from a German military warehouse and Kościan was liberated.

=== World War II ===
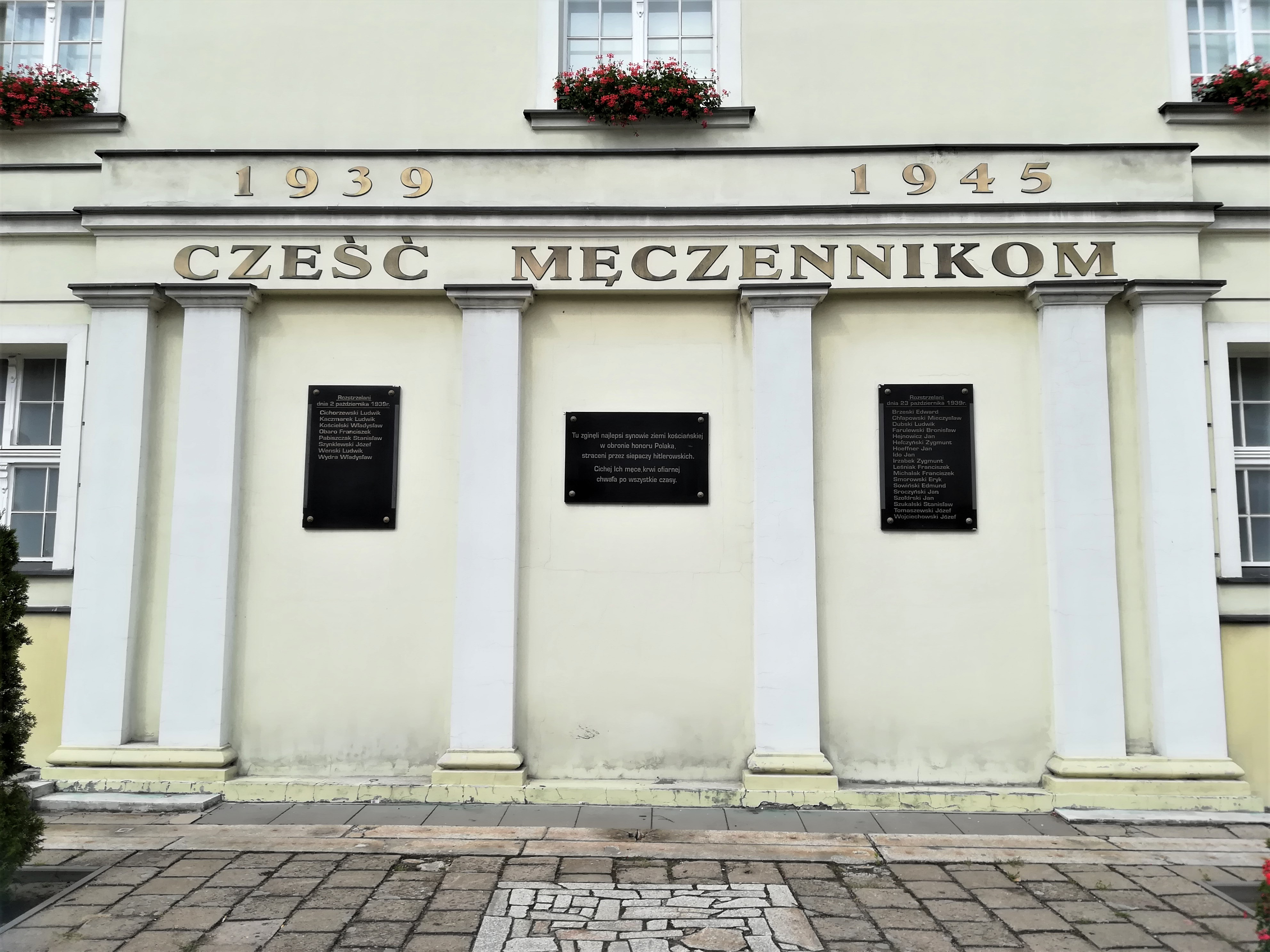
Memorial at the site of public executions of Poles carried out by the Germans on October 2 and October 23, 1939

During the German occupation of Poland (World War II), the Polish population was subject to mass arrests, executions, expulsions, deportations to Nazi concentration camps and confiscation of property. The Einsatzgruppe VI carried out public executions of Poles in the town on October 2 and October 23, 1939 as part of the Intelligenzaktion, killing 8 and 18 people respectively, including activists, merchants, landowners, the director of the local narrow gauge railway, the chairman of the local branch of the "Sokół" Polish Gymnastic Society, principals of schools from Kościan and the nearby village of Borowo and one student. In Kościan, the Germans operated a prison for Poles from both the town and the region, many of whom were later transported to the infamous Fort VII in Poznań. On November 7 and 9, 1939, 66 Polish craftsmen, merchants, farmers, local officials and workers, previously held in the local prison were massacred in the nearby forest. Further such massacres were carried out by the Germans in December 1939 and in January and February 1940. The local high school principal was among Polish teachers and principals murdered in the Dachau concentration camp. Over 50 Poles, including local activists, intelligentsia and the families of victims of executions, were expelled in 1939, while 2,139 Poles were expelled in 1940, and their houses were then handed over to German colonists as part of the Lebensraum policy. 534 patients of the local psychiatric hospital were gassed by the Germans in January 1940, and afterwards patients from psychiatric hospitals in Germany were transported to Kościan and also gassed. The occupiers established and operated a forced labour subcamp of the Stalag XXI-D prisoner-of-war camp in the town.

The Polish resistance movement was active, including local units of the Union of Armed Struggle/Home Army, Narodowa Organizacja Bojowa and the Pakt Czterech secret scouting organization. Two Polish underground newspapers were printed in the town. In mid-1941, the Gestapo crushed the Pakt Czterech organization and arrested its members, who were then sent to Nazi concentration camps, however, they survived. In October 1941, the Gestapo arrested the founders of the local unit of the Narodowa Organizacja Bojowa, who were then sentenced to death and executed the following year. In 1944, the Germans arrested Leon Ciszak and Franciszek Bawor, leaders of the local units of the Union of Armed Struggle and Home Army, who were then imprisoned in the notorious camp in Żabikowo and soon sent to concentration camps. Bawor died in the Mauthausen concentration camp, whereas Ciszak survived and returned to Kościan after the war. The pre-way Polish mayor of the town joined the resistance in Warsaw.

== Transport ==
Kościan is bypassed to the west by the S5 expressway.

Kościan has a station on the Poznań-Wrocław railway line.

Buses connect Kościan to Poznań and to Leszno.

== Sports ==
The local football club is Obra Kościan. It competes in the lower leagues.

== Notable people ==
- Dezydery Chłapowski (1788–1879), general and political activist
- Klemens Koehler (1840–1901), physician
- Józef Surzyński (1851–1919), composer
- Feliks Stamm (1901–1976), boxing coach
- Izabella Zielińska (1910–2017), pianist
- Rafał Bryndal (born 1960), satirist and journalist
- Jarosław Jaromi Drażewski (born 1961), musician
- Waldemar Brygier (born 1970), journalist
- Bartosz Jurecki (born 1979), handball player
- Michał Jurecki (born 1984), handball player
- Krystian Klecha (born 1984), speedway rider
- Maria Stenzel (born 1998), volleyball player
- Adam Szłapka (born 1984), politician
- Tomasz Nowak (born 1985), footballer
- Zofia Nowakowska (born 1988), singer

== International relations ==
=== Twin towns – Sister cities ===
Kościan is twinned with:

Alzey in Germany (since 1990); Istra in Russia (since 2001); Krimpen aan den IJssel in Netherlands (since 1994)	Nederlek in Netherlands (since 1994); Rakovník in Czech Republic (since 2005); Wernshausen in Germany (since 1996)

== Gallery ==
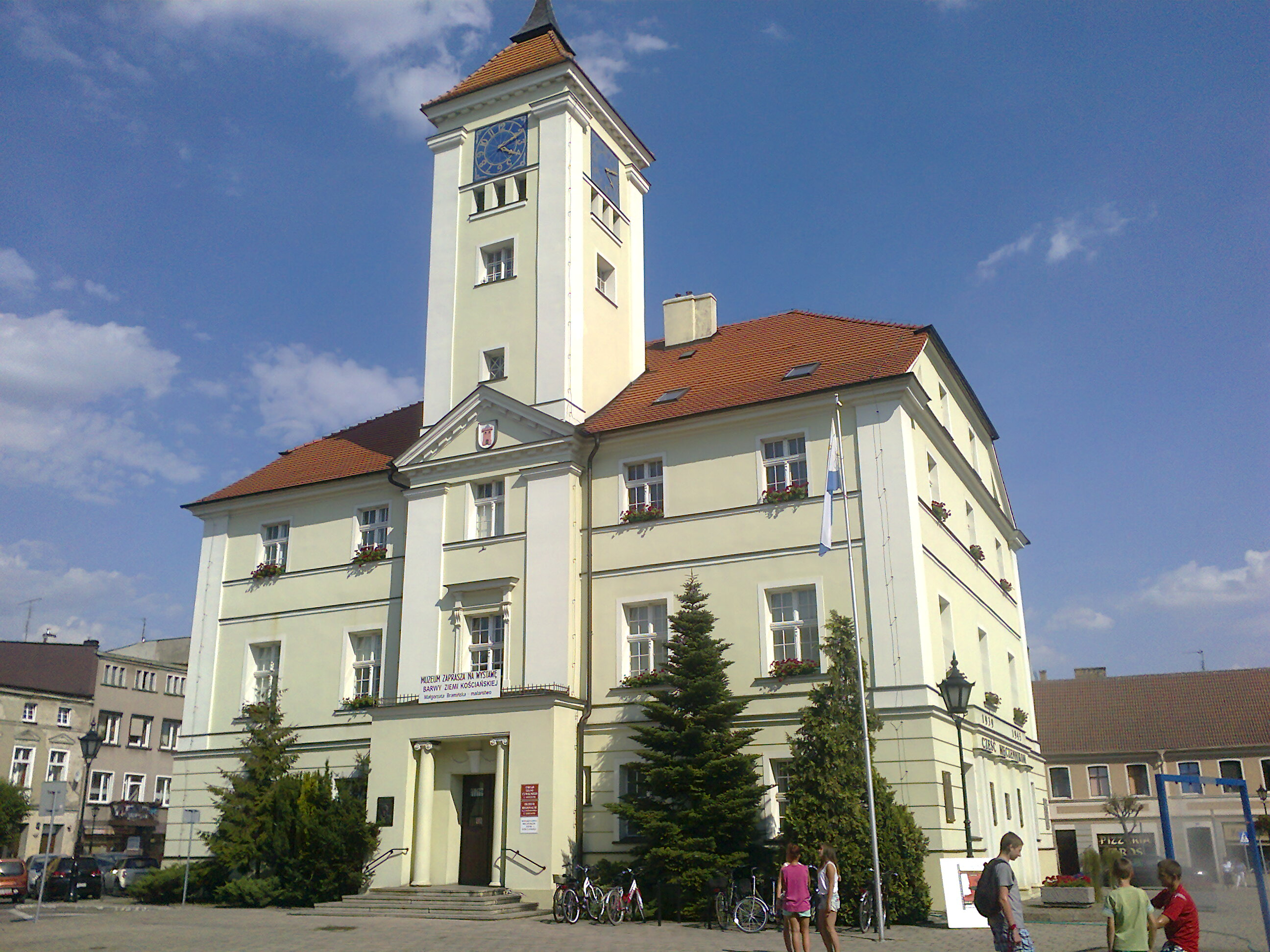
Town hall, which currently houses the Regional Museum

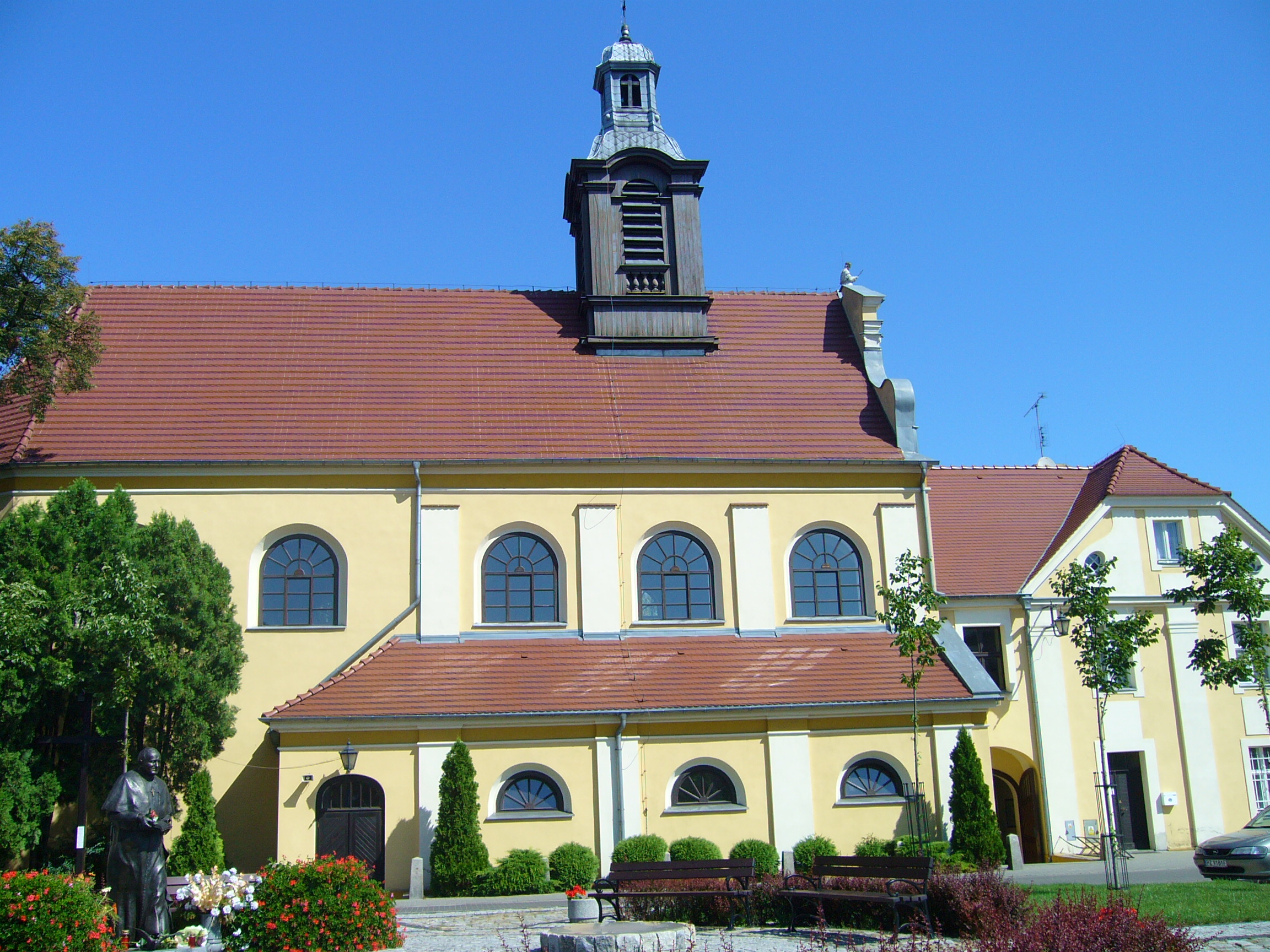
Christ Church built in 1666

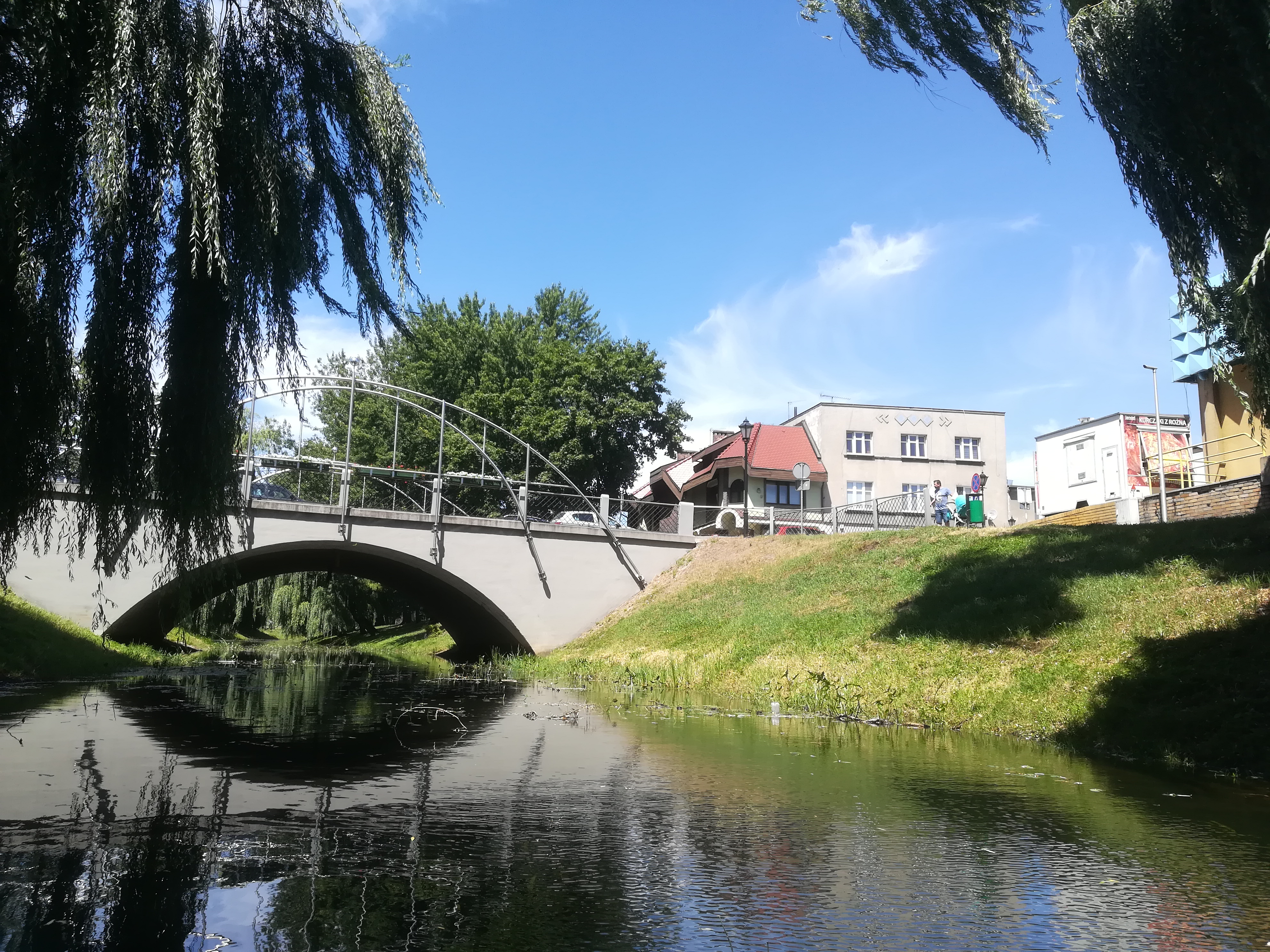
Kościański Canal

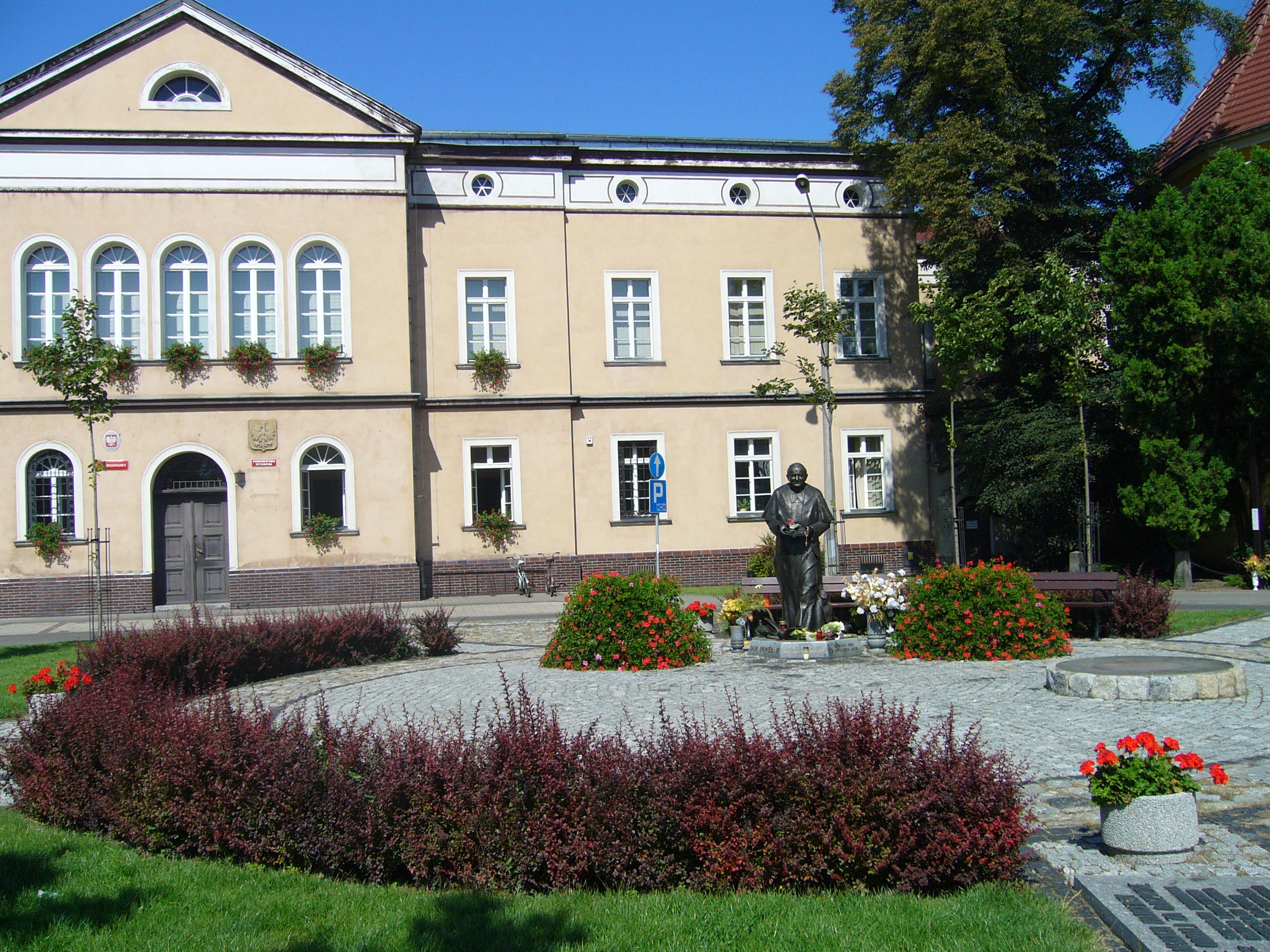
District court and Pope John Paul II Monument

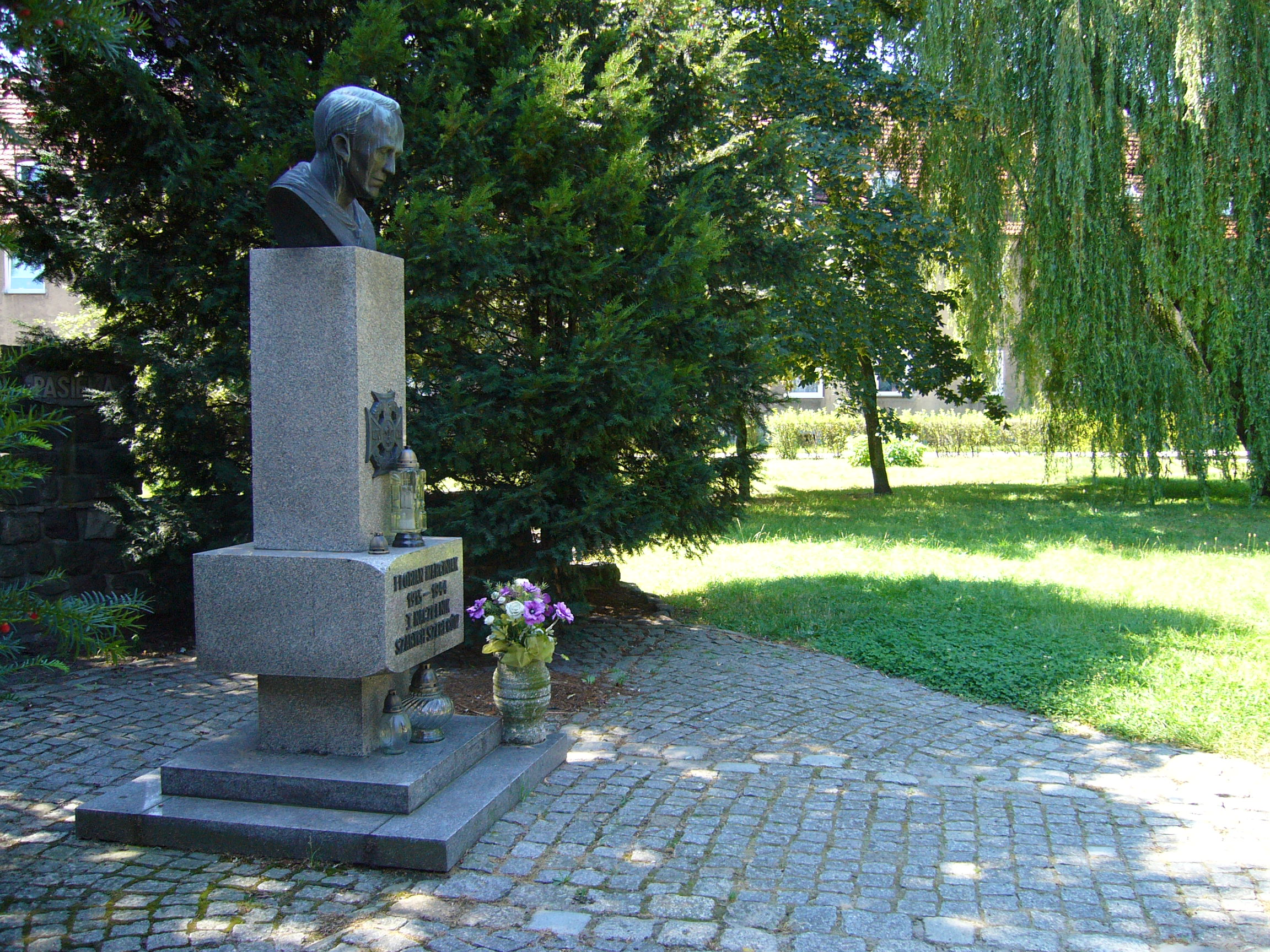
Florian Marciniak Monument

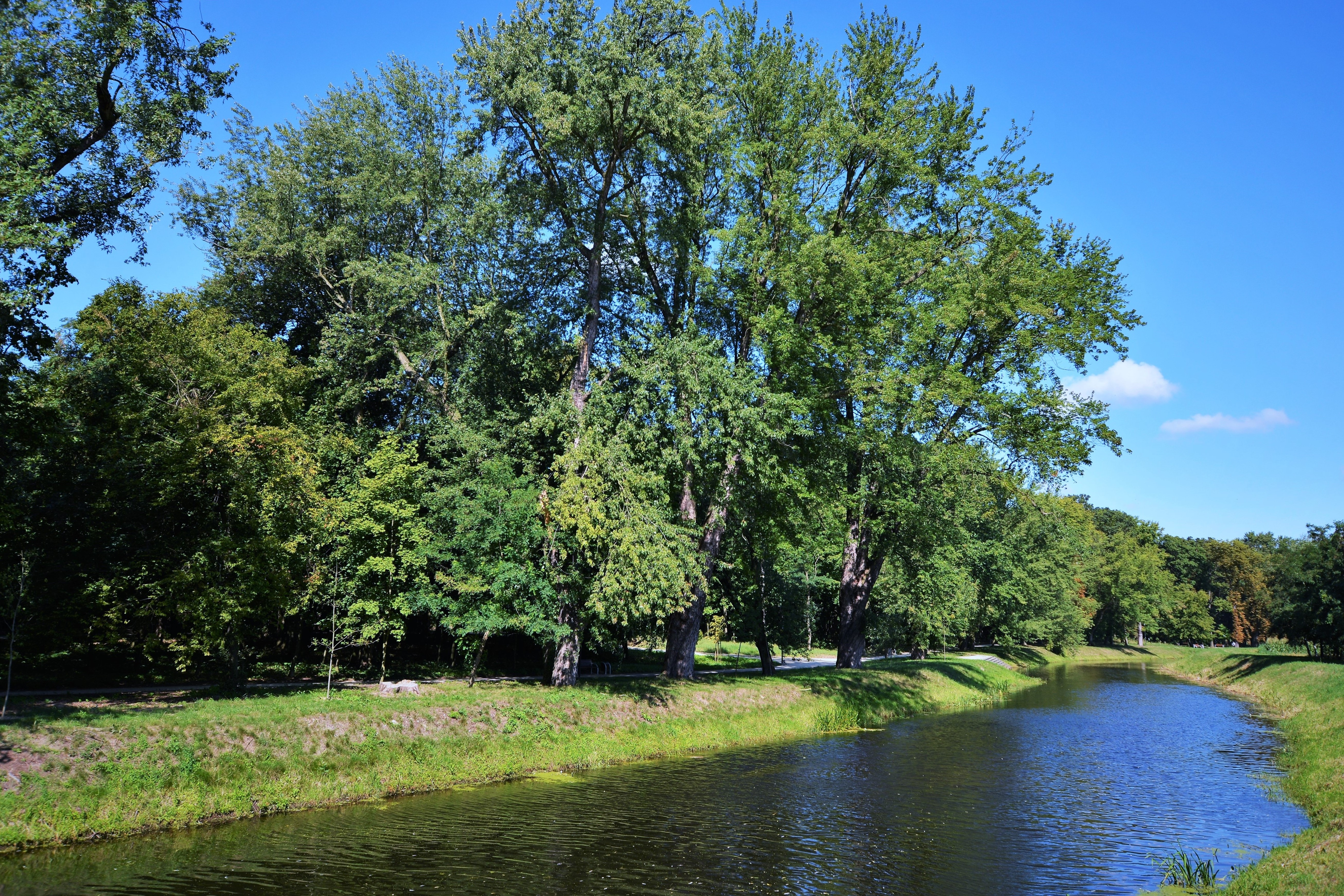
Municipal park
