= Zbytki, Greater Poland Voivodeship =

Zbytki
- Village
- Location within Poland
- Coordinates: 51°52′N 16°48′E
- Country: Poland
- Voivodeship: Greater Poland
- County: Leszno
- Gmina: Krzemieniewo

Zbytki [ˈzbɨtki] is a village in the administrative district of Gmina Krzemieniewo, within Leszno County, Greater Poland Voivodeship, in west-central Poland.
