= Mały Dwór, Greater Poland Voivodeship =

Mały Dwór
- Settlement
- Location within Poland
- Coordinates: 51°50′29″N 16°44′51″E
- Country: Poland
- Voivodeship: Greater Poland
- County: Leszno
- Gmina: Krzemieniewo

Mały Dwór [ˈmawɨ ˈdvur] is a settlement in the administrative district of Gmina Krzemieniewo, within Leszno County, Greater Poland Voivodeship, in west-central Poland.
