= Pawłowice Palace =

Coordinates: 51°49′47″N 16°45′02″E

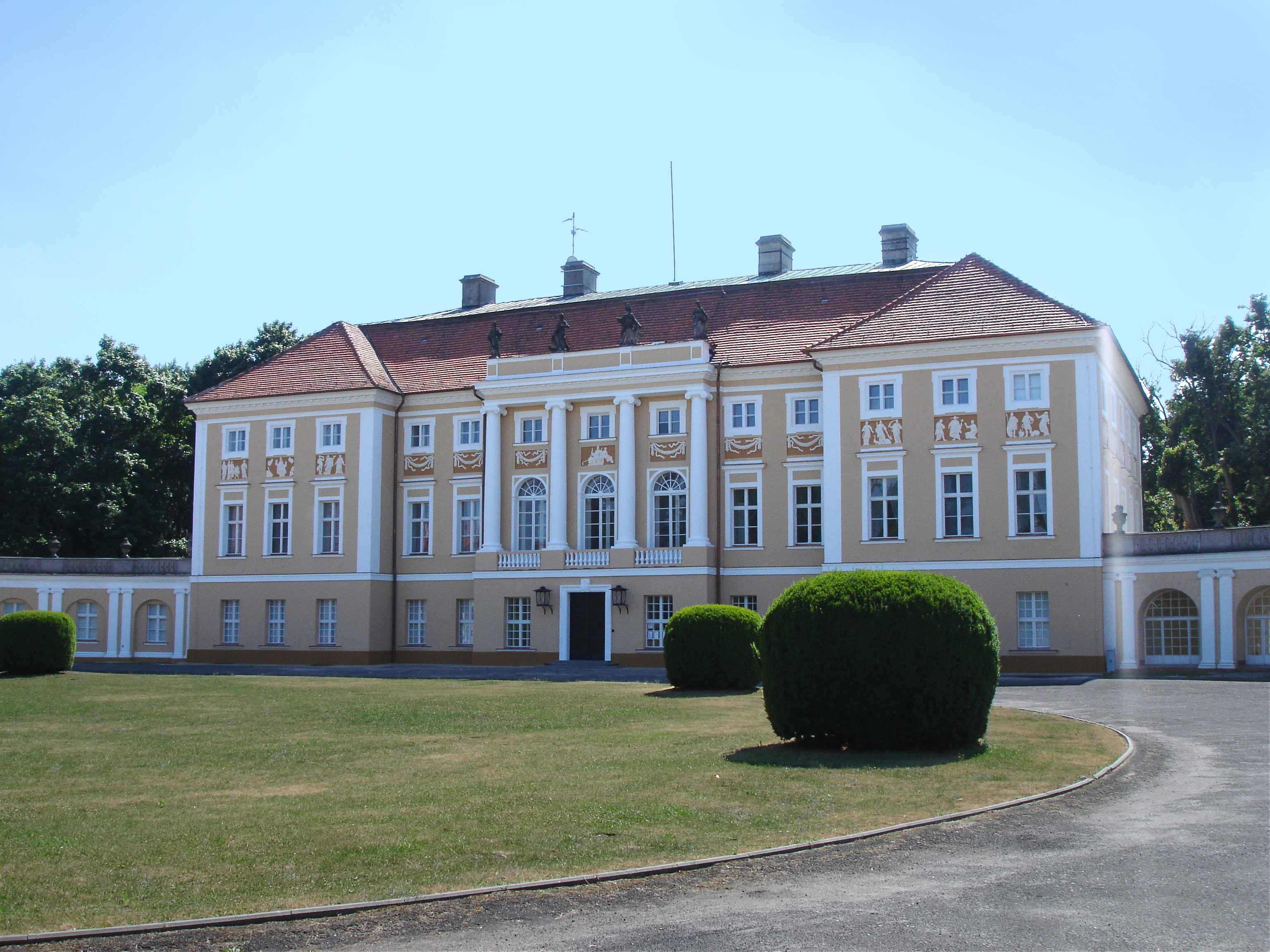

Pawłowice is a palace belonging to the Mielzynski family, members of the Polish nobility. It is located in Pawłowice village.
