= Kałowo =

- Settlement
- Location within Poland
- Coordinates: 51°47′49″N 16°50′32″E
- Country: Poland
- Voivodeship: Greater Poland
- County: Leszno
- Gmina: Krzemieniewo

Kałowo [kaˈwɔvɔ] is a settlement in the administrative district of Gmina Krzemieniewo, within Leszno County, Greater Poland Voivodeship, in west-central Poland.
