= Nadolnik, Leszno County =

Nadolnik
- Settlement
- Location within Poland
- Coordinates: 51°48′01″N 16°49′26″E
- Country: Poland
- Voivodeship: Greater Poland
- County: Leszno
- Gmina: Krzemieniewo

Nadolnik [naˈdɔlnik] is a settlement in the administrative district of Gmina Krzemieniewo, within Leszno County, Greater Poland Voivodeship, in west-central Poland.
