= Bielawy, Leszno County =

Bielawy
- Village
- Location within Poland
- Coordinates: 51°51′23″N 16°52′22″E
- Country: Poland
- Voivodeship: Greater Poland
- County: Leszno
- Gmina: Krzemieniewo

Bielawy ([bjɛˈlavɨ]; German: Bielawy, 1943–45 Gersdorf) is a village in the administrative district of Gmina Krzemieniewo, within Leszno County, Greater Poland Voivodeship, in west-central Poland.
