= 17th Greater Poland Uhlan Regiment =

- 17 Pułk Ułanów Wielkopolskich
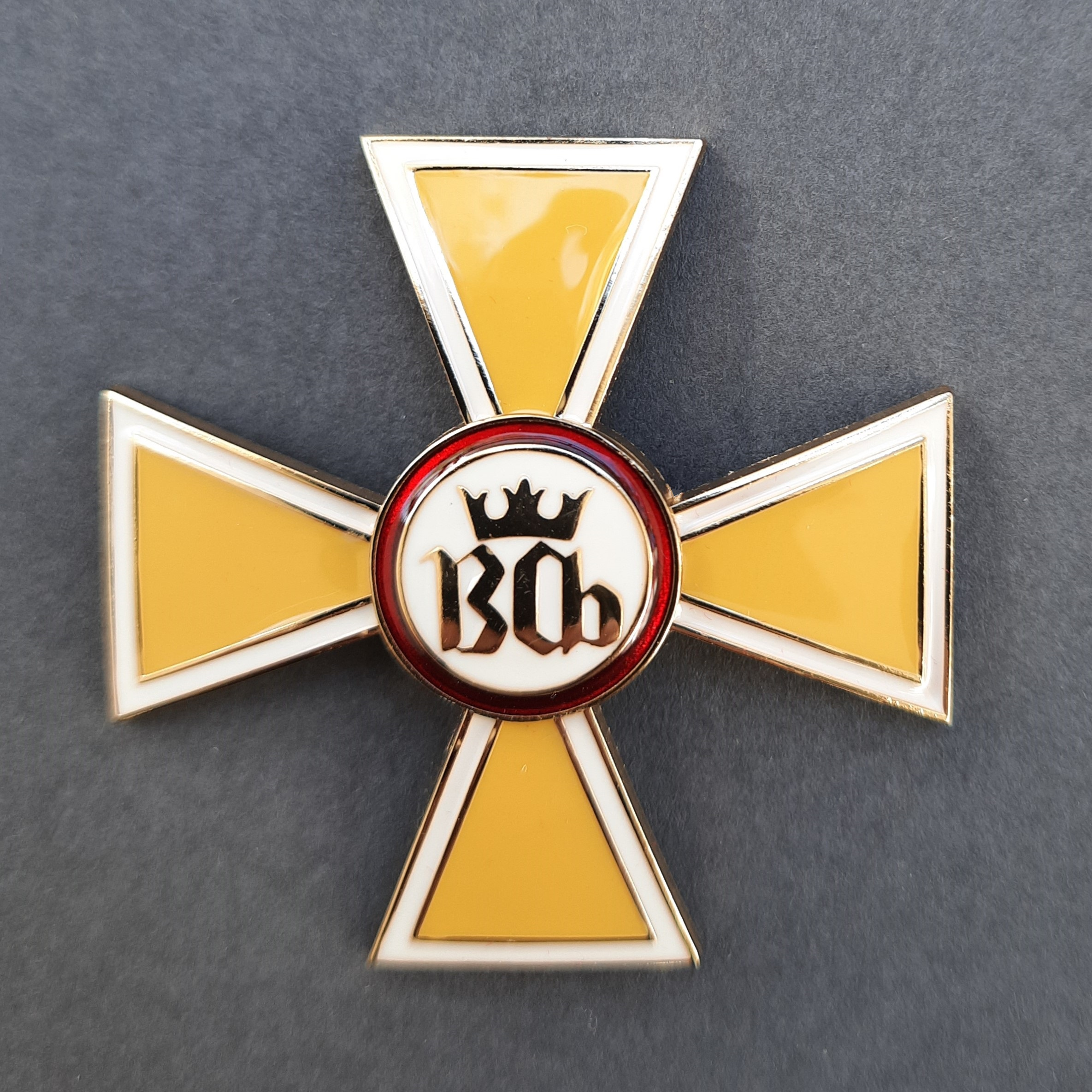
- Badge of the regiment
- Active: 1918 – 1939
- Country: Poland
- Branch: Wielkopolska Cavalry Brigade
- Type: Uhlan
- Role: Cavalry
- Garrison/HQ: Leszno
- Anniversaries: May 7
- Engagements: Greater Poland Uprising; Polish-Ukrainian War; Polish-Soviet War: Kiev offensive; May Coup; World War II: Invasion of Poland

17th Greater Poland Uhlan Regiment of King Bolesław Chrobry (Polish: 17 Pułk Ułanów Wielkopolskich im. Króla Bolesława Chrobrego, 17 puł) was a cavalry unit of the Polish Army in the Second Polish Republic. Formed in late 1918, it was garrisoned in Leszno. The regiment, whose patron was King Bolesław Chrobry (since May 6, 1939), fought in the Polish–Soviet War and the 1939 invasion of Poland, as part of the Wielkopolska Cavalry Brigade.

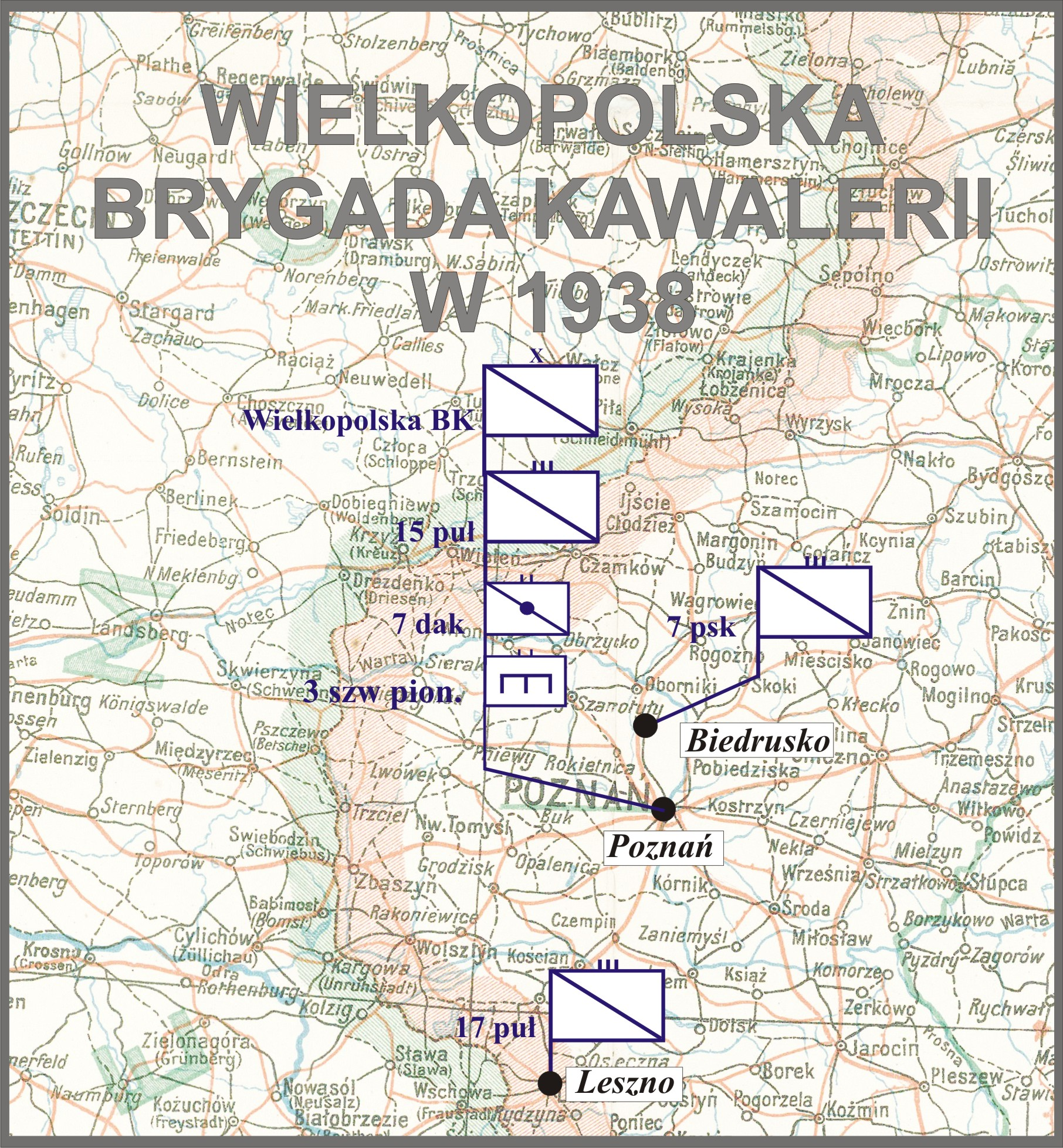
Wielkopolska BK w 1938

== Beginnings ==
The 3rd Greater Poland Uhlan Regiment, as it was called at first, was formed in late 1918 in Gniezno (Gnesen), where local Poles, following the example set by Poznań, decided to take control of the town, and push out Prussian authorities. At that time Gniezno was a large garrison of the Imperial German Army, with the 49th Infantry Regiment and the 12th Dragoon Regiment stationed here. Following a quick action, the Poles captured the barracks, and disarmed the soldiers, who were then loaded on trains and headed back to their homes.

In early January 1919, Colonel Kazimierz Grudzielski, local commandant of Polish forces, ordered Colonel Edward Grabski to form a cavalry unit. On January 6, the first volunteers were accepted, and after four days, a cavalry squadron was created. The uhlans took part in the Greater Poland Uprising, fighting near Szubin and Żnin. On February 9 in Gniezno, the oath of the new unit took place, with General Jozef Dowbor-Musnicki attending the ceremony. By early March, additional squadrons had been formed, and the regiment was completed by March 20, 1919. Most of the officers had served either in the German Army, or Polish I Corps in Russia, while regular soldiers were local peasants and workers, equipped mostly with captured German weapons.

By August 1919, the regiment had 22 officers and 789 soldiers, with almost 800 horses. In autumn 1919, the unit was sent to the newly created Polish Corridor, to return to Gniezno in early February 1920.

== Polish–Soviet War ==
In mid-February 1920, the regiment was loaded on a train, and was transported to Wilno, where its name was changed to the 17th Greater Poland Uhlan Regiment. On March 12, Colonel Witold Zychlinski was named its commandant, and after a two-week training, the unit was transported to the frontline along the Berezina river. In mid-April 1920, it was transported to Ukraine, to support Polish forces in the Kiev offensive (1920). It fought with distinction, capturing the town of Malyn. On May 7, 1920, mounted patrols of the regiment entered Kiev. To commemorate this event, May 7 was named as regimental holiday. For the remaining part of May and in early June, the regiment patrolled the Dniepr river line, but after the Soviet counteroffensive it was forced to retreat, together with the whole VII Cavalry Brigade.

After heavy fighting during the June 1920 retreat, the regiment lost up to 80% of its strength. By early July, it had only 109 soldiers and 2 machine guns. Transported by rail to Kowel (July 19), it was allowed to rest, and reinforced with 500 men. On August 3, after capturing Radziwiłłow, the regiment was attacked by much stronger Soviet forces, who decimated the unit. After losing 40% of soldiers and 50% of horses, the 17th Greater Poland Uhlan Regiment was on September 10 loaded on a train in Chodorow, to be transported back to Gniezno.

== Second Polish Republic ==
After the return to the hometown, the command of the regiment was taken over by Colonel Erazm Stablewski, who reorganized the unit. Older soldiers were released, new uniforms were accepted, and in 1922, the regiment was moved to its new, peacetime garrison, located in Leszno, close to the German border. At Leszno, the regiment was set in former Prussian barracks. The town was at that time a large garrison of the Polish Army, as the 55th Infantry Regiment was also stationed there.

In the 1930s, some 300 conscripts joined the regiment, with half of them coming from Greater Poland, and the remaining part from central Poland and Lesser Poland. During the May Coup in 1926, the regiment was ordered to come to aid the government of President Stanislaw Wojciechowski, and, together with whole VII Cavalry Brigade, was transported by rail to Mszczonow near Warsaw. It did not take part in the street fighting in the Polish capital, and soon returned to Leszno.

In late September 1938, the regiment became part of the so-called Independent Operational Group Silesia, and participated in the capture of the region of Trans-Olza.

== 1939 September Campaign ==
On August 24, 1939, the regiment was mobilized, as part of Wielkopolska Cavalry Brigade (General Roman Abraham). Its task was to protect southwestern corner of Greater Poland. Following the oath and a parade in a field by Leszno, the regiment with its 1160 soldiers and 40 officers marched off to its positions near the border.

On September 1, 1939, at approximately 8 a.m., the Germans attacked Polish uhlans stationed in Rydzyna, capturing the town. When reinforcements arrived later that day, the Poles managed to push out the enemy before nightfall.

On September 2, following the order of General Abraham, the 55th Infantry Regiment carried out the Raid on Fraustadt, while uhlans of the 17th Regiment also entered German territory.

Since general situation of Poland worsened, the retreat of Poznań Army was ordered on September 4. The regiment marched towards Konin, Turek and Kutno, in the general direction of Warsaw. All units of the army were covered in the south by the cavalry regiments, including the 17th Regiment. The Greater Poland uhlans were ordered to cross the Bzura river near the village of Sobota, and then to capture Głowno. Front-line battalions of the regiment clashed with advancing Germans. The enemy retreated, and the Poles advanced across the Bzura, towards the village of Walewice. Polish attack against German 26th Infantry Regiment (30th Infantry Division) began at 5 a.m., on September 10. After a fierce, hand-to hand battle, the Germans again retreated. Polish losses amounted to 64 killed, while the enemy lost around 100.

For the whole day of September 10, 1939, heavy fighting continued around the town of Głowno. On the next day, General Abraham decided to throw all forces available to him, in order to capture Głowno. His plan failed, as the Germans attacked first, surprising the Poles, who retreated behind the Bzura.

On September 15, the so-called Operational Group of Cavalry was formed, out of the elements of Wielkopolska Cavalry Brigade and Podolska Cavalry Brigade. Its task was to open the road towards Warsaw, across the Kampinos Forest. Heavy fighting continued until September 18, when the regiment reached Palmiry. After a short rest, however, the uhlans were attacked again by German tanks. The Battle of Sieraków, as it was unofficially called, was one of the last victories of the Greater Poland Uhlans.

During the September Campaign, the regiment lost 49 officers and 149 soldiers.

== Commandants ==
- Colonel Edward Grabski (1919),
- Colonel Kazimierz Raszewski (1919),
- Colonel Wladyslaw Mosiewicz (March 1919 – March 1920),
- Colonel Witold Zychlinski (March – July 1920),
- Colonel Wlodzimierz Podhorski (July – October 1920),
- Colonel Erazm Stablewski (October 1920 -1921),
- Colonel Wlodzimierz Podhorski (July – 1921 March 1929),
- Colonel Aleksander Praglowski (March 1929 – January 1936),
- Colonel Tadeusz Kurnatowski (January 1936 – March 1938),
- Colonel Ignacy Kowalczewski (April 1938 – September 1939).

== Sources ==
- Piotr Bauer: Zarys historii wojennej pułków polskich w kampanii wrześniowej. 17 Pułk Ułanów Wielkopolskich. Warszawa: Oficyna Wydawnicza „Ajaks", 1994
- Henryk Smaczny: Księga kawalerii polskiej 1914–1947: rodowody, barwa, broń. Warszawa: TESCO, 1989

== See also ==
- Polish cavalry
