= Greater Poland Cavalry Brigade =

Historical cavalry unit of the Polish Army

- Wielkopolska Brygada Kawalerii
- Active: 1 April 1937 – 28 September 1939
- Country: Poland
- Role: Cavalry
- Garrison/HQ: Poznań
- Engagements: World War II: Invasion of Poland; Battle of the Bzura

Greater Poland Cavalry Brigade (Polish: Wielkopolska Brygada Kawalerii) was a cavalry unit of the Polish Army in the interwar period. It was created on April 1, 1937 out of the Cavalry Brigade "Poznań". Its headquarters were stationed in Poznań and the brigade consisted of these units:

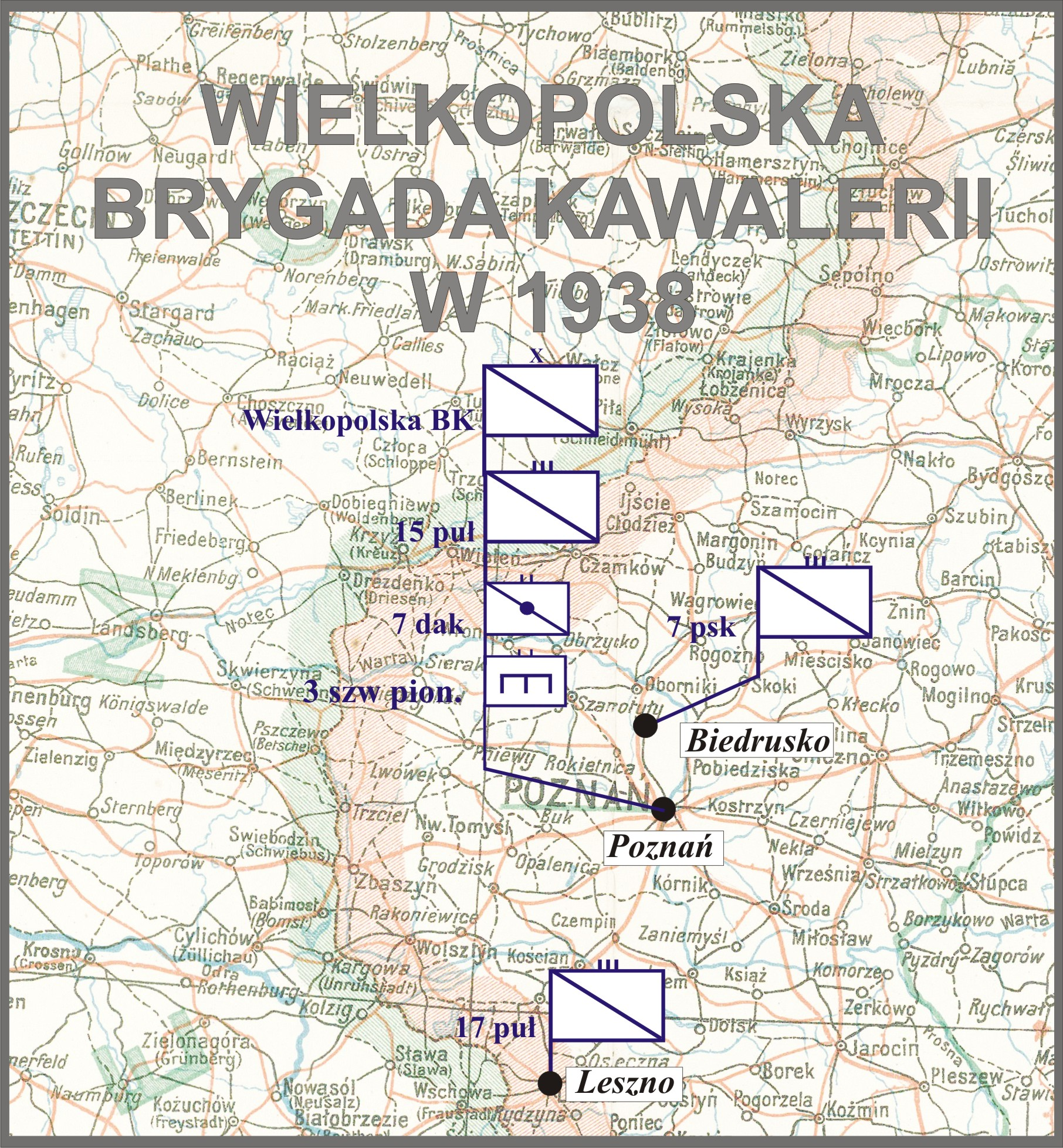
Greater Poland Cavalry Brigade w 1938

- 16th Greater Poland Uhlan Regiment
- 15th Poznań Uhlans Regiment, stationed in Poznań,
- 17th Greater Poland Uhlan Regiment of King Bolesław Chrobry, stationed in Leszno
- 7th Greater Poland Mounted Rifles Regiment, stationed in Biedrusko,
- 7th Greater Poland Mounted Artillery Regiment, stationed in Poznań,
- 3rd Squadron of Pioneers, stationed in Poznań,
- 7th Squadron of Communications, stationed in Poznań.

== Polish September Campaign ==
The Brigade, under General Roman Abraham, was part of the Poznań Army. On the first day of the Polish September Campaign, its forces counterattacked the Wehrmacht in the area of Leszno and Rawicz, together with the 25th Infantry Division. On September 2, 1939, parts of the Brigade broke into German territory, attacking Fraustadt and destroying a column of German vehicles. In the following days, the Brigade, together with the whole Poznań Army, withdrew eastwards from Greater Poland. On September 8, 1939, the cavalrymen covered the eastern wing of the Army during the outbreak of the Battle of the Bzura. In the night of September 9–10, 1939, the Brigade attacked the enemy, with initial successes of the 17th Regiment of Greater Poland Uhlans and the 15th Regiment of Poznań Uhlans. However, soon afterwards German defense stiffened and the Brigade halted.

On September 11, together with the 11th Infantry Division, the Brigade attacked Głowno, facing German 24th Infantry Division under General Friedrich Olbricht. As Polish momentum weakened, on September 13 the Brigade was ordered to withdraw across the Bzura near Brochow, continuously fighting the German 4th Mountain Division of General Georg-Hans Reinhardt. Skirmishes lasted until September 16, when the Brigade retreated into the Kampinos Forest. There, together with the Pomeranian Cavalry Brigade and Podolska Cavalry Brigade, it created the Joint Cavalry Brigade of General Abraham. On September 18, the unit fought off an attack of German 29th Motorised Division of General Joachim Lemelsen. Two days later it broke into besieged Warsaw, where it surrendered on September 28, 1939.

== See also ==
- Polish army order of battle in 1939
- Polish contribution to World War II
- Podolska Cavalry Brigade
