= Wygoda, Leszno County =

Wygoda
- Settlement
- Location within Poland
- Coordinates: 51°52′36″N 16°51′46″E
- Country: Poland
- Voivodeship: Greater Poland
- County: Leszno
- Gmina: Krzemieniewo

Wygoda [vɨˈɡɔda] is a settlement in the administrative district of Gmina Krzemieniewo, within Leszno County, Greater Poland Voivodeship, in west-central Poland.
