= Lubonia, Greater Poland Voivodeship =

Lubonia
- Village
- Location within Poland
- Coordinates: 51°49′N 16°48′E
- Country: Poland
- Voivodeship: Greater Poland
- County: Leszno
- Gmina: Krzemieniewo

Lubonia [luˈbɔɲa] is a village in the administrative district of Gmina Krzemieniewo, within Leszno County, Greater Poland Voivodeship, in west-central Poland.
