= Bojanice, Leszno County =

Bojanice
- Village
- Location within Poland
- Coordinates: 51°55′04″N 16°50′03″E
- Country: Poland
- Voivodeship: Greater Poland
- County: Leszno
- Gmina: Krzemieniewo

Bojanice [bɔjaˈnit͡sɛ] is a village in the administrative district of Gmina Krzemieniewo, within Leszno County, Greater Poland Voivodeship, in west-central Poland.
