= Roman Abraham =

Polish general

Roman Józef Abraham
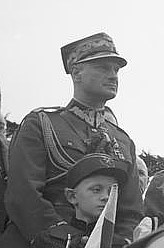
- Roman Abraham in 1938
- Born: 28 February 1891; Lemberg, Austria-Hungary
- Died: 26 August 1976 (aged 85); Warsaw, Poland
- Military career
- Branch: Austro-Hungarian Army; Polish Army
- Rank: Brigadier-General
- Units: Wielkopolska Cavalry Brigade; Polish Collective Cavalry Brigade
- Commands: Commander, Cavalry Brigade
- Conflicts: World War I Polish–Ukrainian War; Polish–Soviet War; World War II; Invasion of Poland; Battle of the Bzura; Siege of Warsaw
- Awards: Order of Virtuti Militari; Order of Polonia Restituta; Cross of Independence with Swords; Cross of Valour; Golden Cross of Merit; Wound Decoration; Legion of Honour (France); Ordre des Palmes académiques (France); Order of the Star of Romania

Roman Józef Abraham (28 February 1891 – 26 August 1976) was a Polish cavalry general, commander of the Wielkopolska Cavalry Brigade during the German and Soviet Invasion of Poland in September 1939, and Battle of Bzura commander of Polish cavalry (combined cavalry unit). During the Second Polish Republic, he was Brigadier-General and, for a short period, from 1930 to 1931, Abraham was also a member of the Polish Parliament.

== Early life and education ==
Abraham was born in Lwów, in what was then Austria-Hungary (later in Poland, now Lviv, Ukraine). He was the son of Władysław Abraham, professor of Canon law and rector of the University of Lwów. He studied at the Jesuit School in Chyrów in Bąkowice, graduating in 1910. He then studied at the Faculty of Philosophy and Law at Jan Kazimierz University in Lwów, graduating in 1915.

== Military service ==
=== World War I ===
During World War I he served from August 1914 to October 1918 in the Austro-Hungarian army in the 1st Regiment of Uhlans of National Defence, fighting on the French, Romanian, Russian, Serbian and Italian fronts, ending his service as a Lieutenant in the cavalry.

=== Polish-Ukrainian War ===
At the end of World War I, he joined the Polish Military Cadres in Lwów. From 1 November 1918 in the reformed Polish Army in the rank of lieutenant, he was the commander of the Góra Strudenia sector in Lwów.
He created his own unit, later called "Straceńcami". The unit fought successfully in various defences of Lwów, in the defence of Persenkówka, and in Śródmieście. The unit raised the Polish banner at the Lwów City Hall at dawn on 22 November, and on 24 November 1918 he was appointed the rank of Captain. However, his troops were accused of numerous robberies. An account, for instance, cited that the Galician unit he commanded allegedly plundered from peasants living in captured Ukrainian villages, hauling all that could be transported to Lwów.
From January to August 1919 he commanded an independent battalion, regiment and Operational Group in the division of Colonel Władysław Sikorski. From August 1919, he was an officer in the operating department and an observer in the 59th Air Force Squadron. He also participated in Polish-Ukrainian battles around Przemyśl.

=== Polish-Bolshevik War ===
In 1920, Abraham defended the city of Lwów during the Polish-Bolshevik War. He was wounded during the conflict but he continued performing his duties, commanding his unit whilst being carried on a stretcher.

=== World War II ===
In the September Campaign in 1939, he commanded Wielkopolska Brygada Kawalerii as part of the "Poznań" Army, commanded by gen. Tadeusz Kutrzeba. He fought in the area of Leszno, Śrem and Rawicz. From 9 September in the Battle of Bzura he commanded attacks on Sobota and Walewice and from 13 September he took part in heavy fighting in the area of Brochów, Sieraków and Laski. From 15 to 21 September he commanded the Operational Group of his own name, which included the Wielkopolska Brygada Kawalerii and the Podolska Brygada Kawalerii. Some of the units from the first Brigade reached Warsaw on 20 September. General Abraham was the only commander of the cavalry tactical unit, which throughout the entire combat trail of the September campaign did not suffer a single defeat, did not lose a single battle. Near Brochów and Sochaczew the German 4th Panzer Division and 2nd Light Division withdrew from his soldiers. On September 23, Maj. Gen. T. Kutrzeba appointed Brig. Gen. Roman Abraham commander of the Collective Cavalry Brigade in the defense of Warsaw. As its head he fought until the capitulation of the capital city on September 28. From 1939 to 1945 he was a Prisoner of War in Oflag VII-A Murnau in Germany. A handwritten card sent by Abraham to his friend in Chicago from his prison has been preserved, and is currently part of the Centralne Muzeum Jeńców Wojennych's collection.

== Decorations ==
- Virtuti Militari, Silver Cross (1922)
- Cross of Merit, Gold Cross (1930, 1938, 1940)
- Polonia Restituta, Officer's Cross (1933)
- Cross of Independence with Swords (1933)
- Virtuti Militari, Golden Cross (1961)
- Polonia Restituta, Commander's Cross (1970)
- Cross of Valour 5 times
- Lwów Defence Cross
- Légion d'honneur, Knight's Cross (France)
