= Oporowo, Leszno County =

Oporowo
- Village
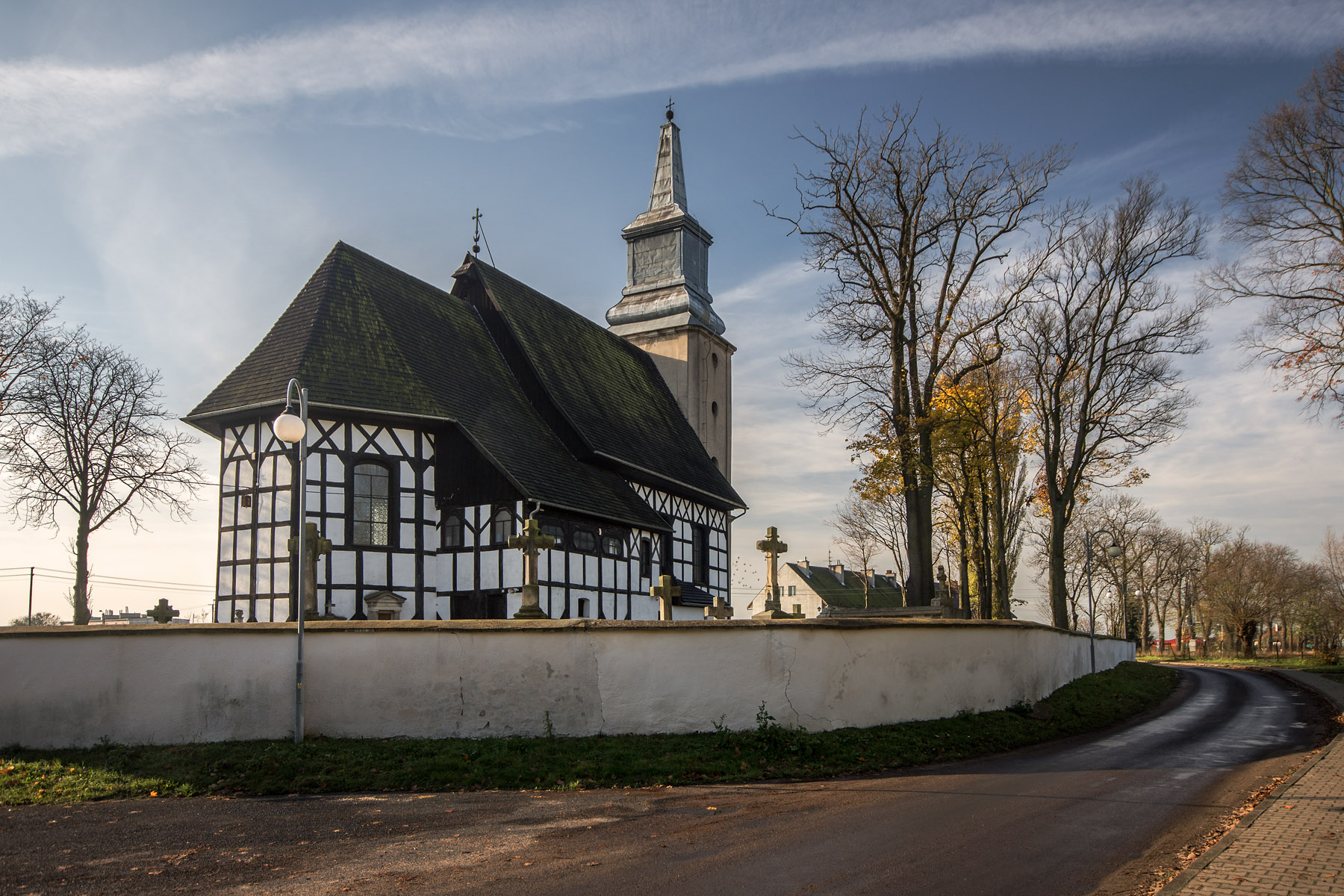
- Local timber framed church

- Location within Poland
- Coordinates: 51°48′N 16°50′E
- Country: Poland
- Voivodeship: Greater Poland
- County: Leszno
- Gmina: Krzemieniewo

Oporowo [ɔpɔˈrɔvɔ] is a village in the administrative district of Gmina Krzemieniewo, within Leszno County, Greater Poland Voivodeship, in west-central Poland.
