= Brylewo, Greater Poland Voivodeship =

Brylewo
- Village
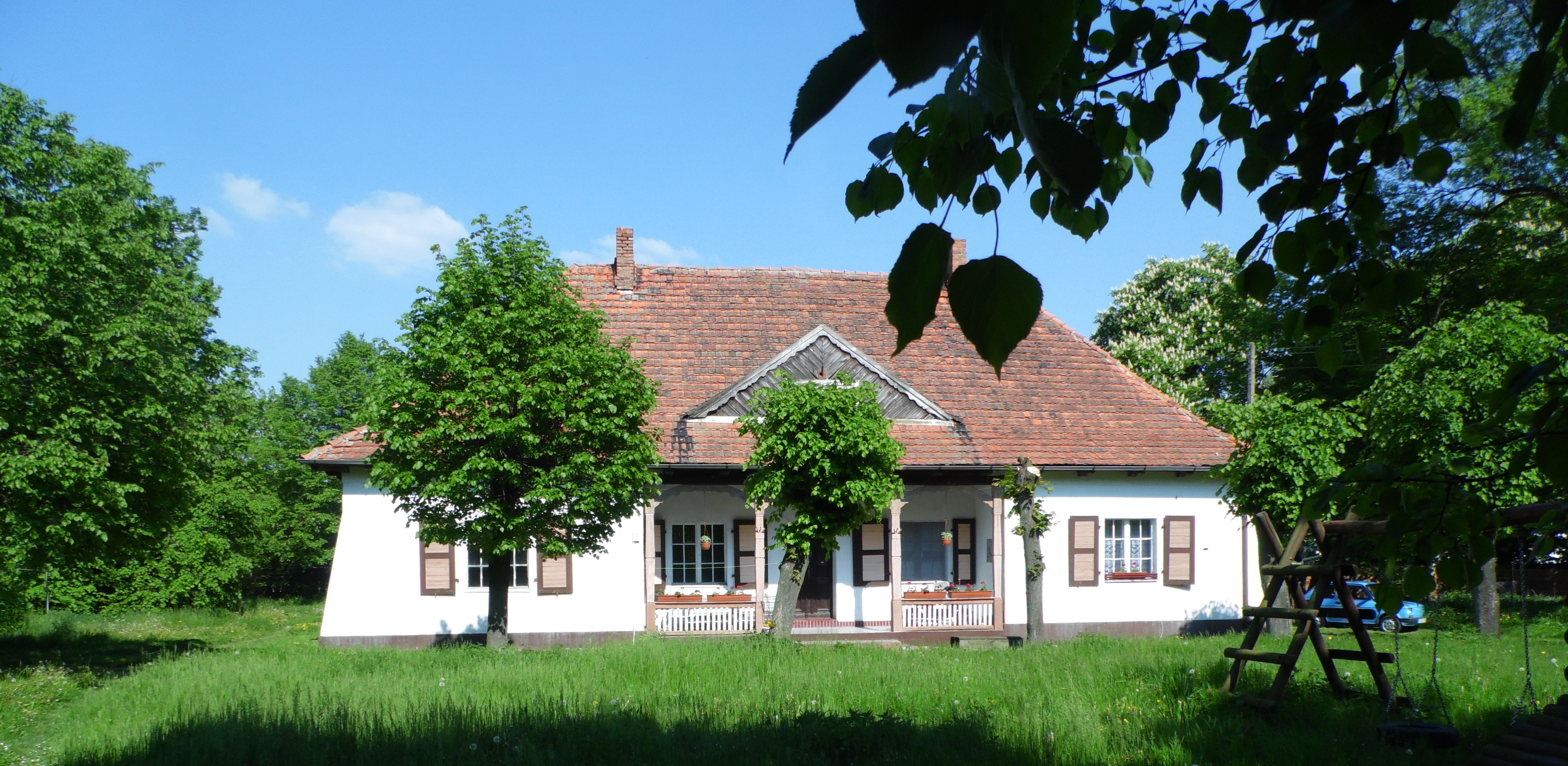
- Mid 19th century building in Brylewo, Leszno district

- Location within Poland
- Coordinates: 51°52′07″N 16°51′56″E
- Country: Poland
- Voivodeship: Greater Poland
- County: Leszno
- Gmina: Krzemieniewo

Brylewo [brɨˈlɛvɔ] is a village in the administrative district of Gmina Krzemieniewo, within Leszno County, Greater Poland Voivodeship, in west-central Poland.
