= Borowo, Kościan County =

Borowo
- Village
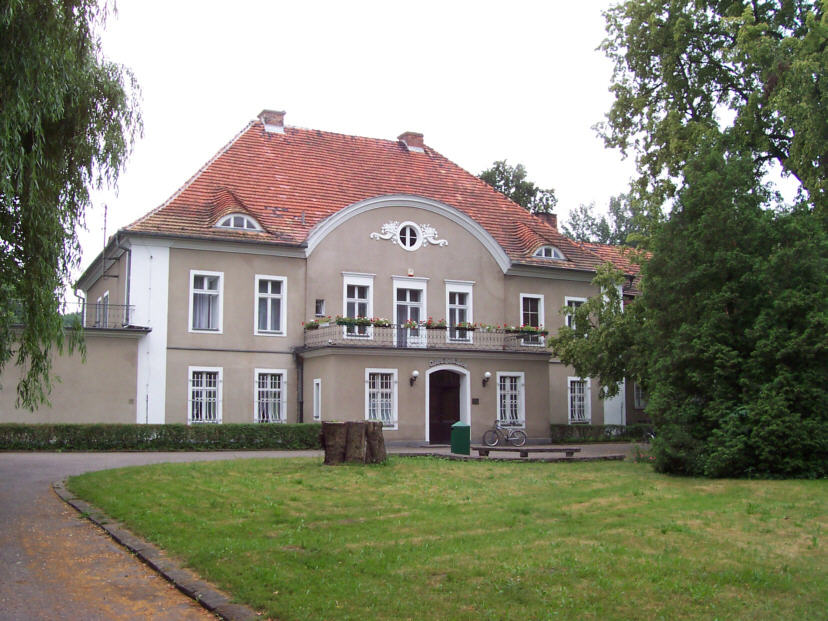
- Historic manor in Borowo

- Location within Poland
- Coordinates: 52°7′N 16°47′E
- Country: Poland
- Voivodeship: Greater Poland
- County: Kościan
- Gmina: Czempiń
- Population: 580
- Time zone: UTC+1 (CET)
  - Summer (DST): UTC+2 (CEST)

Borowo [bɔˈrɔvɔ] is a village in the administrative district of Gmina Czempiń, within Kościan County, Greater Poland Voivodeship, in west-central Poland.

== History ==
Borowo was a private village of Polish nobility, administratively located in the Kościan County in the Poznań Voivodeship in the Greater Poland Province of the Polish Crown. In the mid-19th century it was owned by the Mizerski family.

During the German occupation of Poland (World War II), the principal of the local primary school, Józef Wojciechowski, was murdered in a public execution of 18 Poles carried out in the nearby town of Kościan on 23 October 1939, by the Einsatzgruppe VI as part of the Intelligenzaktion. Inhabitants of Borowo were also among the victims of a massacre of 45 Poles carried out on 7 November 1939, in the forest near Kościan.
