= Krzemieniewo, Greater Poland Voivodeship =

Krzemieniewo
- Village
- Location within Poland
- Coordinates: 51°51′N 16°49′E
- Country: Poland
- Voivodeship: Greater Poland
- County: Leszno
- Gmina: Krzemieniewo
- Population: 5,000

Krzemieniewo [kʂɛmjɛˈɲɛvɔ] is a village in Leszno County, Greater Poland Voivodeship, in west-central Poland. It is the seat of the gmina (administrative district) called Gmina Krzemieniewo.
