= Żółków, Greater Poland Voivodeship =

Żółków
- Village
- Location within Poland
- Coordinates: 52°3′45″N 17°35′21″E
- Country: Poland
- Voivodeship: Greater Poland
- County: Jarocin
- Gmina: Żerków
- Time zone: UTC+1 (CET)
  - Summer (DST): UTC+2 (CEST)
- Vehicle registration: PJA

Żółków [ˈʐuu̯kuf] is a village in the administrative district of Gmina Żerków, within Jarocin County, Greater Poland Voivodeship, in west-central Poland.

== History ==
Żółków was a private village of Polish nobility, administratively located in the Pyzdry County in the Kalisz Voivodeship in the Greater Poland Province of the Polish Crown.

During the German occupation of Poland (World War II), inhabitants of Żółków were among Poles massacred by the Germans on 9 November 1939, in Mędzisko as part of the Intelligenzaktion.
