= Iwno, Greater Poland Voivodeship =

Iwno
- Village
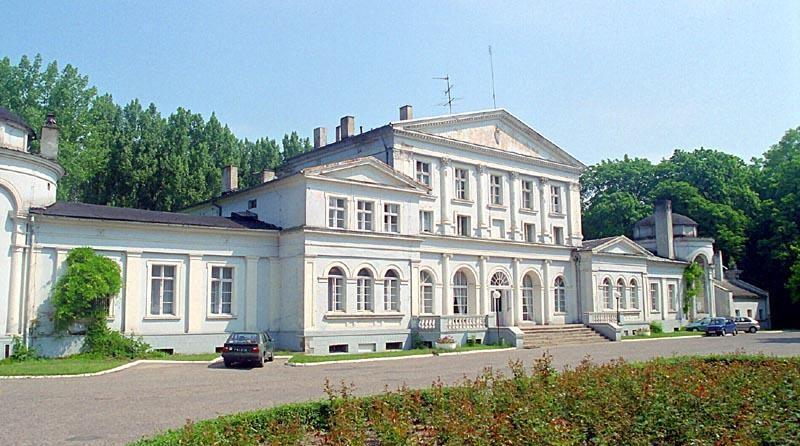
- Iwno Palace

- Location within Poland
- Coordinates: 52°24′N 17°16′E
- Country: Poland
- Voivodeship: (Greater Poland Voivodeship) Greater Poland
- County: Poznań
- Gmina: Kostrzyn
- Population: 730
- Time zone: UTC+1 (CET)
  - Summer (DST): UTC+2 (CEST)
- Vehicle registration: POZ, PZ
- Primary airport: Poznań–Ławica Airport

Iwno (Polish: [ˈivnɔ]) is a village in the administrative district of Gmina Kostrzyn, within Poznań County, Greater Poland Voivodeship, in west-central Poland.

== History ==
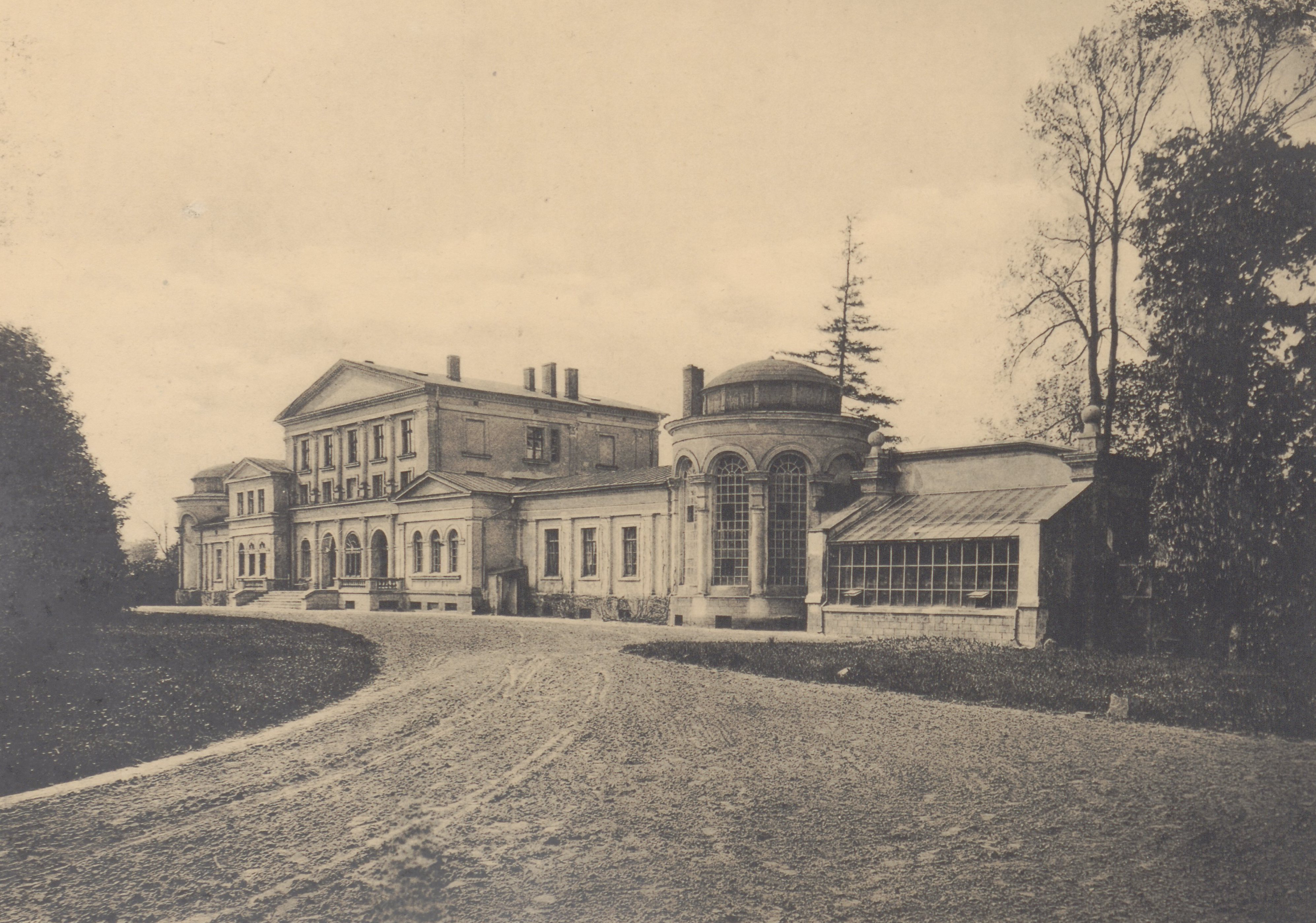
Early 20th-century view of the Mielżyński Palace

As part of the region of Greater Poland, i.e. the cradle of the Polish state, the area formed part of Poland since its establishment in the 10th century. It was a private village of Polish nobility, administratively located in the Poznań County in the Poznań Voivodeship in the Greater Poland Province. The last owners of the village and palace, until 1939, were the Mielżyński family. Afterwards, Iwno was converted into a premier horse farm and riding school.

During the German occupation of Poland (World War II), the local school principal and the local estate administrator were among the victims of a massacre of Poles committed by the Germans in nearby Kostrzyn on 20 October 1939, as part of the genocidal Intelligenzaktion campaign.

== Sights ==
The landmarks of Iwno are the Mielżyński Palace and the Baroque Our Lady of the Scapular church.

== Notable people ==
- Katarzyna Tomicka (c.1517–1551), Polish noblewoman, sister-in-law of Queen consort of Poland Barbara Radziwiłł
- Józef Kiszkurno (1895–1981), Polish Olympic shooter
