= Kociugi =

- Village
- Location within Poland
- Coordinates: 51°50′N 16°47′E
- Country: Poland
- Voivodeship: Greater Poland
- County: Leszno
- Gmina: Krzemieniewo

Kociugi [kɔˈt͡ɕuɡi] is a village in the administrative district of Gmina Krzemieniewo, within Leszno County, Greater Poland Voivodeship, in west-central Poland.
