= Mielżyński =

Aristocratic family

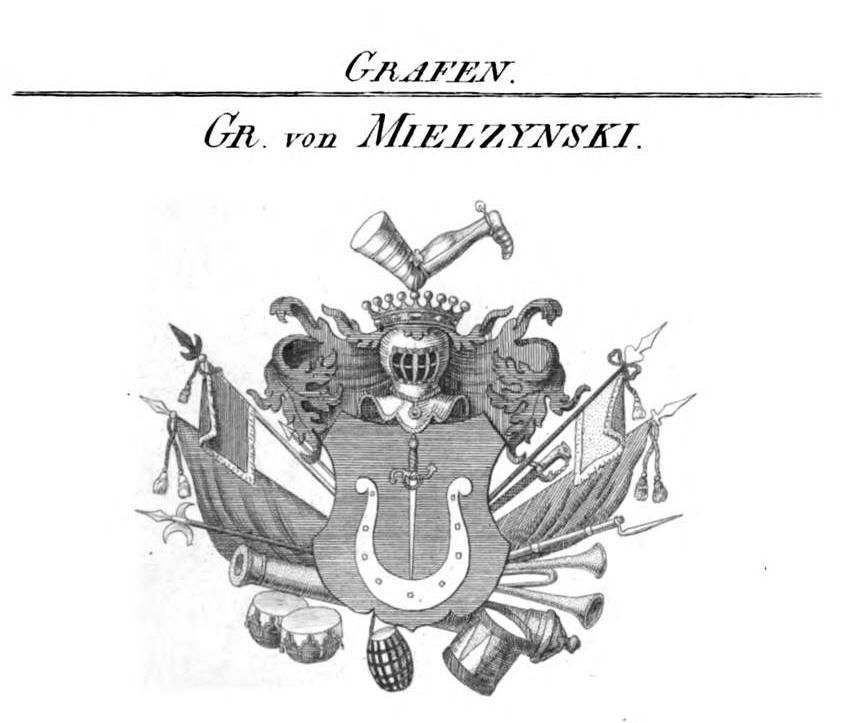
Coat of arms of Counts Mielżyński

The House of Mielżyński (Polish pronunciation: [mʲɛlˈʐɨɲskʲi]) is the name of one of Poland's oldest noble families. They used the Nowina coat of arms.

== History ==
Reference to the family's founder, Jan z Mielżyn, first appeared in the late 14th century. The family bears the arms of the house of Nowina thereby claiming ties to Stanislaus of Szczepanów. The Mielżyńskis evolved into a significant and consistent presence in Polish politics until the end of the 20th century. As Greater Poland's wealthiest family they became patrons of the arts. Their estates included over 20,000 hectares and the palaces of Pawłowice and Iwno prior to WWII.

As magnates and members of the szlachta, they built dynastic connections to the royal houses of Europe through marriage. Anna Miełżyńska (1600-1640) was the grandmother of Catherine Opalinska, the queen consort of King Stanislaus Leszczynski of Poland. She was the great-grandmother of Maria Leszczynska, the queen consort of Louis XV of France. The connection through Anna Miełżyńska was extensive for the Mielżyńskis, linking a Polish family to the blood lineages of the House of Bourbon; thereby the thrones of France and modern Spain.

On 19 September 1786, Maxymilian Antoni Jan Mielżyński obtained the hereditary title of Count (hr. Mielzynski h. Nowina) from King Frederick William II of Prussia. His sons, Stanisław Kostka and Mikołaj, appeared in the 1824 list of persons authorized to bear the title of Count in the Kingdom of Poland. Josef (1765–1824; son of Maceij by his wife Seweryna Lipska) obtained the hereditary title of Count from King Frederick William III of Prussia on 12 July 1817 (L.P. 20 January 1818). The family used the German style "von" interchangeably with Polish style "hr." to denote the hereditary title of Count. The modern Mielżyński line descended from Maxymilian exists today with branches in America. The family lineage was last published in "Ruvigny's Titled Nobility of Europe" in 1980.

== See also ==
- Polish–Lithuanian Commonwealth
- Szlachta
- Magnates of Poland and Lithuania
- List of Polish titled nobility
