= Pawłowice, Leszno County =

Pawłowice
- Village
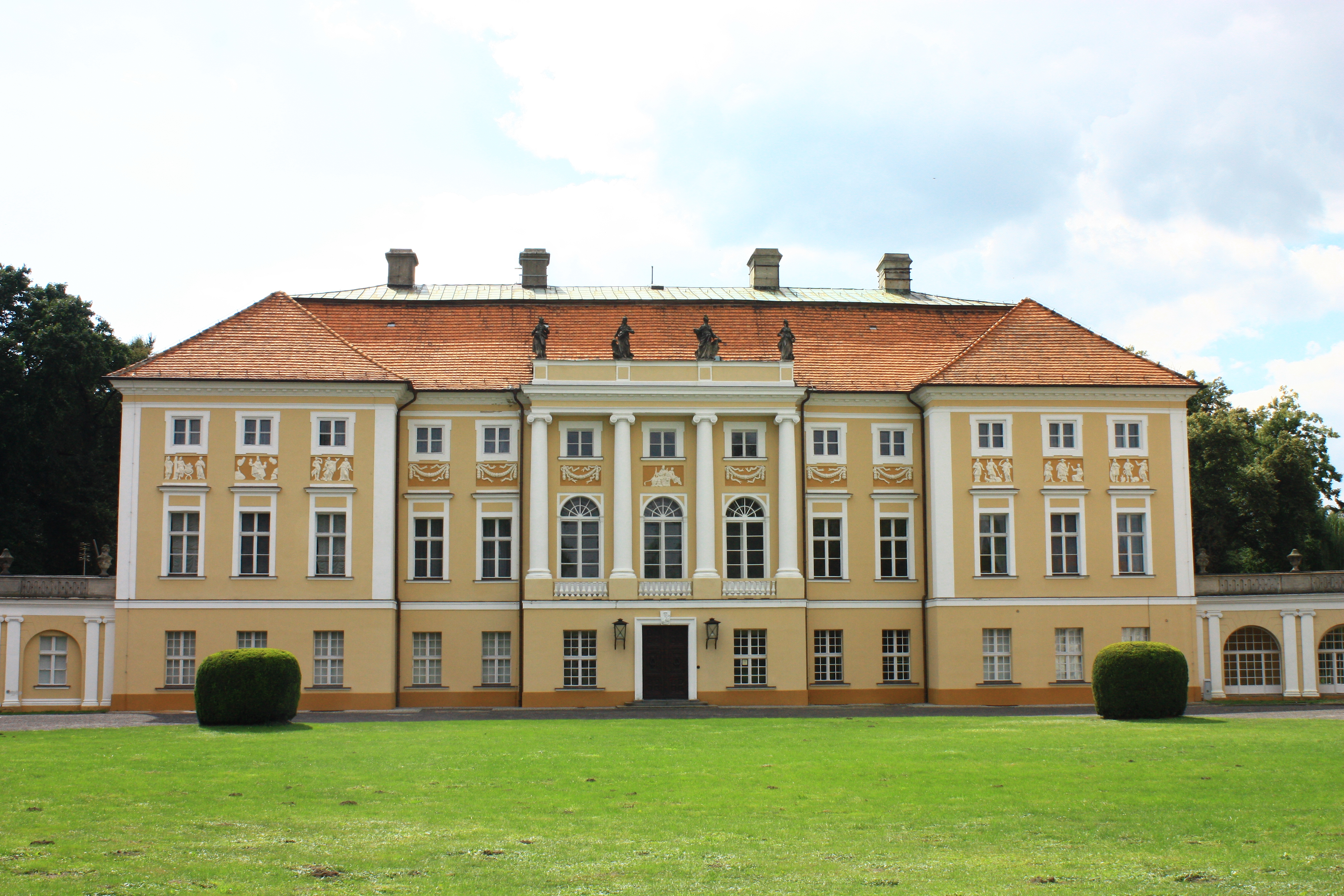
- Pawłowice Palace

- Location within Poland
- Coordinates: 51°49′49″N 16°45′0″E
- Country: Poland
- Voivodeship: Greater Poland
- County: Leszno
- Gmina: Krzemieniewo

Population
  - Total: 2,000
- Postal code: 64-122

Pawłowice [pavwɔˈvit͡sɛ] is a village in the administrative district of Gmina Krzemieniewo, within Leszno County, Greater Poland Voivodeship, in west-central Poland.

The village is the location of a classicist palace built for Maksymilian Mielżyński in 1779–1783.
