= Adamovo =

Adamovo may refer to:

- Adamovo, Russia, several rural localities in Russia
- Adamovo, Slovenia, a settlement in the Municipality of Velike Lašče, Slovenia
- Adamovo, Republic of Buryatia

== See also ==
- Adamowo (disambiguation)
- Adamovsky (disambiguation)
- Adamov (disambiguation)
