= Adamovsky =

Adamovsky or Adamovskiy (masculine), Adamovskaya (feminine), or Adamovskoye (neuter) may refer to:

- Adamovsky District, a district of Orenburg Oblast, Russia
- Adamovsky (surname)

== See also ==
- Adamovka, a list of places with the name
- Adamovo (disambiguation)
