= Adamov =

Adamov may refer to:

- Adamov (surname)
- Adamov (Blansko District), a town in the South Moravian Region, Czech Republic
- Adamov (České Budějovice District), a municipality and village in the South Bohemian Region, Czech Republic
- Adamov (Kutná Hora District), a municipality and village in the Central Bohemian Region, Czech Republic

== See also ==
- Adamovo (disambiguation)
