= Adamowo =

Adamowo may refer to the following places:

- Adamowo, Brodnica County in Kuyavian-Pomeranian Voivodeship (north-central Poland)
- Adamowo, Lipno County in Kuyavian-Pomeranian Voivodeship (north-central Poland)
- Adamowo, Sępólno County in Kuyavian-Pomeranian Voivodeship (north-central Poland)
- Adamowo, Maków County in Masovian Voivodeship (east-central Poland)
- Adamowo, Mława County in Masovian Voivodeship (east-central Poland)
- Adamowo, Gmina Joniec in Masovian Voivodeship (east-central Poland)
- Adamowo, Gmina Nowe Miasto in Masovian Voivodeship (east-central Poland)
- Adamowo, Sierpc County in Masovian Voivodeship (east-central Poland)
- Adamowo, Wyszków County in Masovian Voivodeship (east-central Poland)
- Adamowo, Żuromin County in Masovian Voivodeship (east-central Poland)
- Adamowo, Konin County in Greater Poland Voivodeship (west-central Poland)
- Adamowo, Gmina Osieczna in Greater Poland Voivodeship (west-central Poland)
- Adamowo, Gmina Włoszakowice in Greater Poland Voivodeship (west-central Poland)
- Adamowo, Wolsztyn County in Greater Poland Voivodeship (west-central Poland)
- Adamowo, Pomeranian Voivodeship (north Poland)
- Adamowo, Działdowo County in Warmian-Masurian Voivodeship (north Poland)
- Adamowo, Elbląg County in Warmian-Masurian Voivodeship (north Poland)
- Adamowo, Iława County in Warmian-Masurian Voivodeship (north Poland)
- Adamowo, Olsztyn County in Warmian-Masurian Voivodeship (north Poland)

== See also ==
- Adamovo (disambiguation)
