= Adamovka =

Adamovka (Russian: Адамовка) is the name of several localities in Russia:

- Adamovka, Republic of Bashkortostan, a village in Truntaishevsky Selsoviet of Alsheyevsky District of the Republic of Bashkortostan
- Adamovka, Adamovsky District, Orenburg Oblast, a settlement in Adamovsky Settlement Council of Adamovsky District of Orenburg Oblast
- Adamovka, Perevolotsky District, Orenburg Oblast, a village in Adamovsky Selsoviet of Perevolotsky District of Orenburg Oblast

== See also ==
- Adamovsky (disambiguation)
