= Żołędowo =

Żołędowo may refer to the following places:

- Żołędowo, Kuyavian-Pomeranian Voivodeship (north-central Poland)
- Żołędowo, Masovian Voivodeship (east-central Poland)
- Żołędowo, West Pomeranian Voivodeship (north-west Poland)
