= Ziemnice =

Ziemnice may refer to the following places in Poland:

- Ziemnice, Lower Silesian Voivodeship (south-west Poland)
- Ziemnice, Greater Poland Voivodeship (west-central Poland)
