= Adamovsky (surname) =

Adamovsky or Adamovskiy (feminine: Adamovskaya) is a Russian and Ukrainian surname. Adamovský (feminine: Adamovská) is a Czech surname. These surnames are derived from any of locations called Adamovo or Adamov and literally mean "of/from Adamovo/Adamov". The place names themselves mean "Adam's". Their Polish counterpart is Adamowski. Notable people with these surnames include:

- Andrey Adamovskiy (born 1962), Ukrainian businessman and philanthropist
- Ezequiel Adamovsky (born 1971), Argentine historian and political activist
- Zlata Adamovská (born 1959), Czech actress
