= Frankowo =

Frankowo may refer to the following places:

- Frankowo, Greater Poland Voivodeship (west-central Poland)
- Frankowo, Kuyavian-Pomeranian Voivodeship (north-central Poland)
- Frankowo, Masovian Voivodeship (east-central Poland)
