= Kubice =

Kubice may refer to the following places in Poland:

- Kubice, Masovian Voivodeship
- Kubice, Opole Voivodeship
