= Gawłówek =

Gawłówek may refer to the following places in Poland:

- Gawłówek, Lesser Poland Voivodeship (southern Poland)
- Gawłówek, Masovian Voivodeship (east-central Poland)
