= Zawady Stare =

- Village
- Location within Poland
- Coordinates: 52°42′58″N 20°38′50″E
- Country: Poland
- Voivodeship: Masovian
- County: Płońsk
- Gmina: Nowe Miasto

Zawady Stare [zaˈvadɨ ˈstarɛ] ("Old Zawady") is a village in the administrative district of Gmina Nowe Miasto, within Płońsk County, Masovian Voivodeship, in east-central Poland.
