= Janopole, Płońsk County =

Village in Gmina Nowe Miasto, Poland

Janopole
- Village
- Location within Poland
- Coordinates: 52°38′34″N 20°41′55″E
- Country: Poland
- Voivodeship: Masovian
- County: Płońsk
- Gmina: Nowe Miasto

Janopole [janɔˈpɔlɛ] is a village in the administrative district of Gmina Nowe Miasto, within Płońsk County, Masovian Voivodeship, in east-central Poland.
