= Kąkolewo, Leszno County =

Kąkolewo
- Village
- Location within Poland
- Coordinates: 51°52′3″N 16°41′45″E
- Country: Poland
- Voivodeship: Greater Poland
- County: Leszno
- Gmina: Osieczna
- Population: 2,100

Kąkolewo [kɔnkɔˈlɛvɔ] is a village in the administrative district of Gmina Osieczna, within Leszno County, Greater Poland Voivodeship, in west-central Poland. It was formerly in Leszno Voivodeship (1975–1998).
