= Modzele-Bartłomieje =

Village in Gmina Nowe Miasto, Poland

- Village
- Location within Poland
- Coordinates: 52°42′00″N 20°39′49″E
- Country: Poland
- Voivodeship: Masovian
- County: Płońsk
- Gmina: Nowe Miasto

Modzele-Bartłomieje [mɔˈd͡zɛlɛ bartwɔˈmjɛjɛ] is a village in the administrative district of Gmina Nowe Miasto, within Płońsk County, Masovian Voivodeship, in east-central Poland.
