= Witosław, Greater Poland Voivodeship =

Witosław
- Village
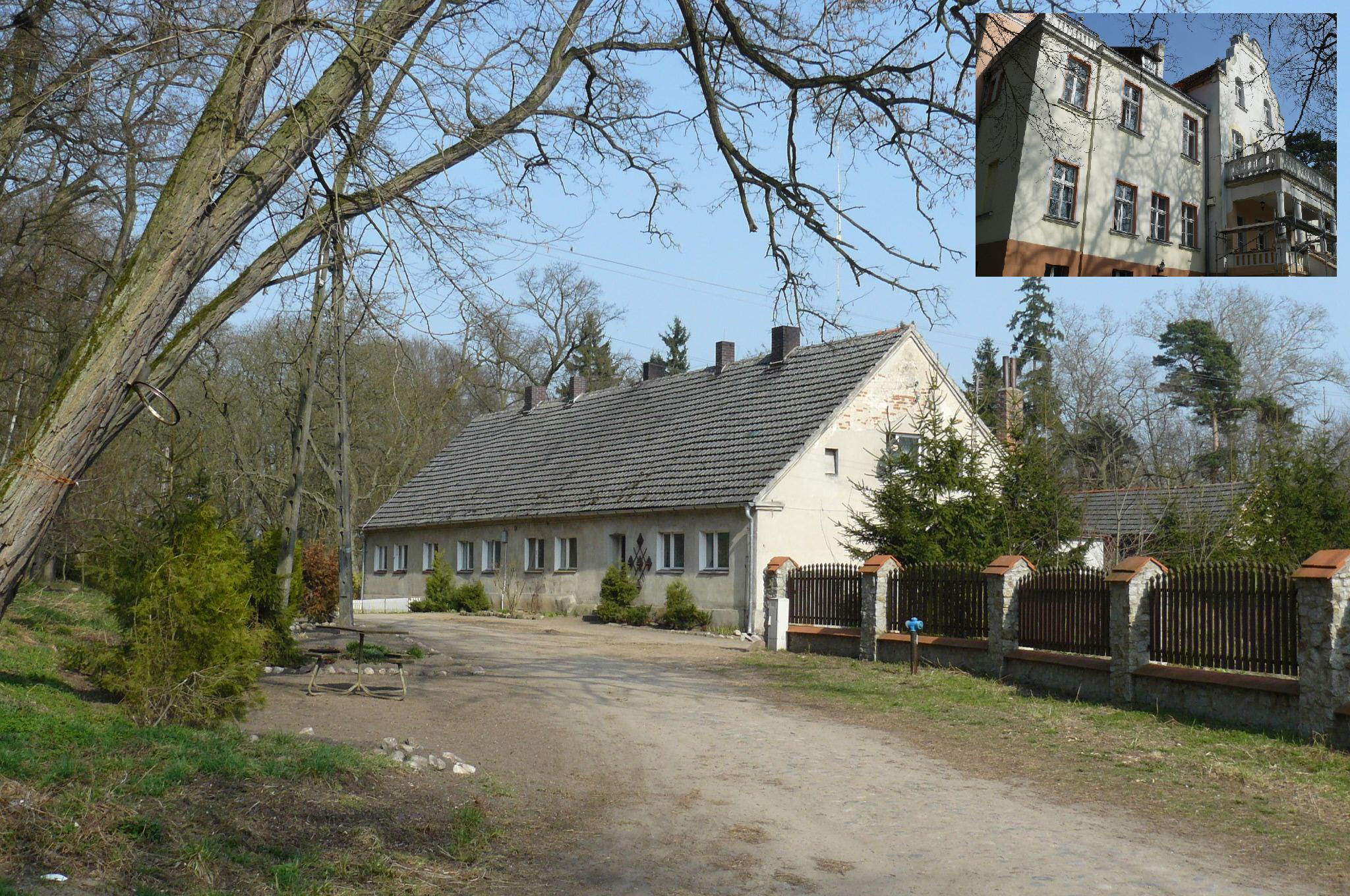

- Location within Poland
- Coordinates: 51°56′44″N 16°42′06″E
- Country: Poland
- Voivodeship: Greater Poland
- County: Leszno
- Gmina: Osieczna

Witosław [viˈtɔswaf] is a village in the administrative district of Gmina Osieczna, within Leszno County, Greater Poland Voivodeship, in west-central Poland.
