= Świerczyna, Leszno County =

Świerczyna
- Village
- Location within Poland
- Coordinates: 51°55′17″N 16°45′37″E
- Country: Poland
- Voivodeship: Greater Poland
- County: Leszno
- Gmina: Osieczna
- Population: 860

Świerczyna (Polish: [ɕfjɛrˈt͡ʂɨna]) is a village in the administrative district of Gmina Osieczna, within Leszno County, Greater Poland Voivodeship, in west-central Poland.
