= Adamovo, Russia =

Adamovo (Russian: Адамово) is the name of several rural localities in Russia:

- Adamovo, Republic of Buryatia, a selo in Adamovsky Selsoviet of Barguzinsky District of the Republic of Buryatia
- Adamovo, Moscow Oblast, a village in Shemetovskoye Rural Settlement of Sergiyevo-Posadsky District of Moscow Oblast
- Adamovo, Perm Krai, a village in Cherdynsky District of Perm Krai
- Adamovo, Porkhovsky District, Pskov Oblast, a village in Porkhovsky District, Pskov Oblast
- Adamovo, Usvyatsky District, Pskov Oblast, a village in Usvyatsky District, Pskov Oblast
- Adamovo, Tver Oblast, a village in Kotlovanskoye Rural Settlement of Udomelsky District of Tver Oblast
- Adamovo, Yaroslavl Oblast, a village in Rodionovsky Rural Okrug of Nekouzsky District of Yaroslavl Oblast

== See also ==
- Adam, Russia
