= Belin, Poland =

Belin
- Village
- Location within Poland
- Coordinates: 52°39′24″N 20°39′46″E
- Country: Poland
- Voivodeship: Masovian
- County: Płońsk
- Gmina: Nowe Miasto

Belin [ˈbɛlin] is a village in the administrative district of Gmina Nowe Miasto, within Płońsk County, Masovian Voivodeship, in east-central Poland.
