= Miąskowo, Leszno County =

Miąskowo
- Village
- Location within Poland
- Coordinates: 51°56′21″N 16°47′58″E
- Country: Poland
- Voivodeship: Greater Poland
- County: Leszno
- Gmina: Osieczna

Miąskowo [mjɔ̃sˈkɔvɔ] is a village in the administrative district of Gmina Osieczna, within Leszno County, Greater Poland Voivodeship, in west-central Poland.
