= Dobramyśl =

- Village
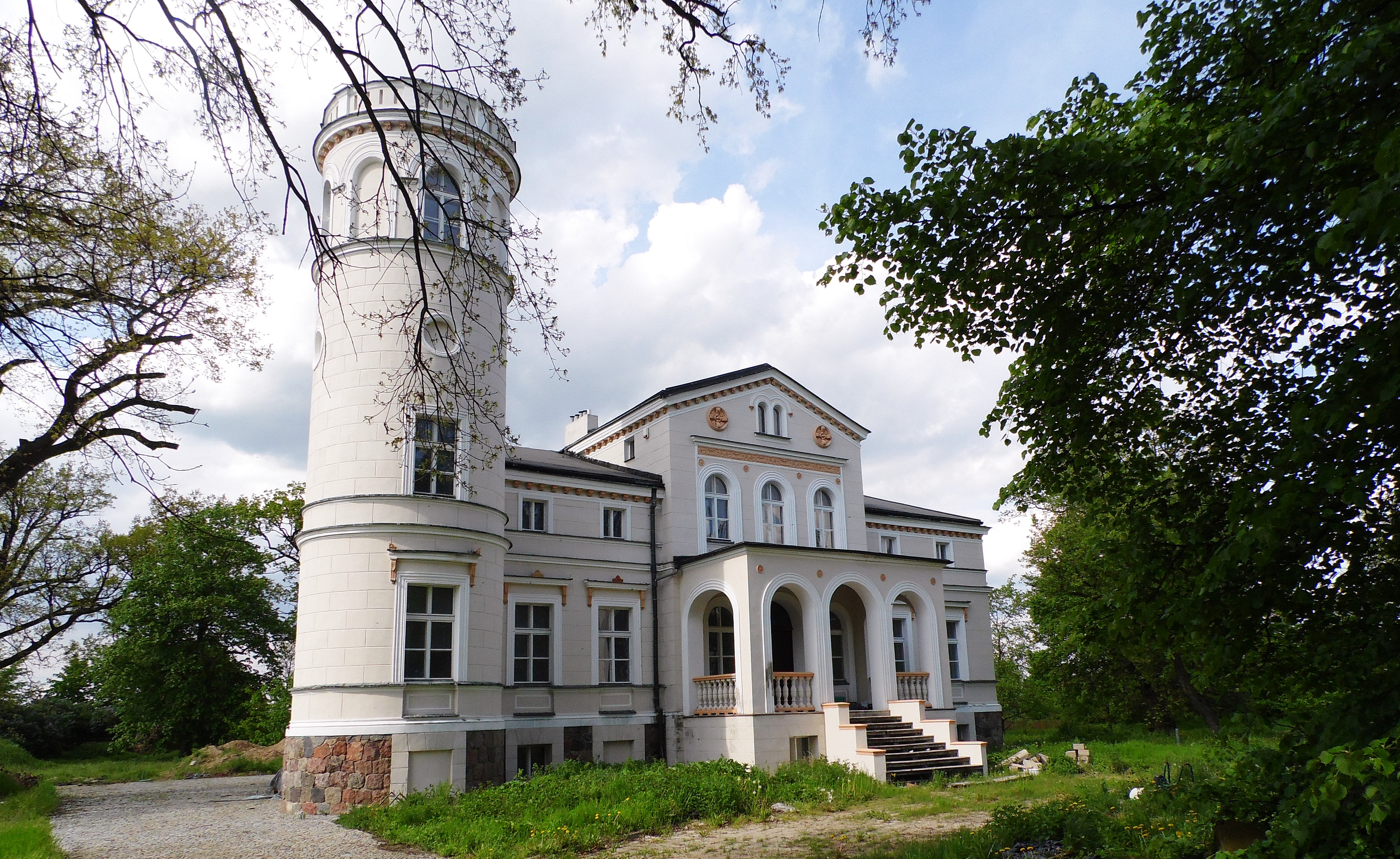
- Palace in the village

- Location within Poland
- Coordinates: 51°52′1″N 16°43′14″E
- Country: Poland
- Voivodeship: Greater Poland
- County: Leszno
- Gmina: Osieczna

Dobramyśl [dɔˈbramɨɕl] is a village in the administrative district of Gmina Osieczna, within Leszno County, Greater Poland Voivodeship, in west-central Poland.
