= Adamov (surname) =

Adamov (Russian: Ада́мов; masculine) or Adamova (Ада́мова; feminine) is a Slavic surname.

There are two theories as to the origins of this last name. According to the most commonly accepted one, they derive from various forms of the Christian masculine given name Adam, which was common in the Ukrainian and Belarusian languages.

Another theory postulates that at least some of these surnames derive from the nicknames which trace their roots to the dialectal word "адам" (adam), meaning a very tall man.

== People with the surname ==
- Adela Adamova (born 1927), Italian-born Argentine ballet dancer
- Arthur Adamov (1908–1970), Russian-born French playwright
- Denis Adamov (born 1998), Russian footballer
- Grigory Adamov (1886–1945), Soviet journalist and science fiction writer
- Jaroslava Adamová (1925–2012), Czech actress
- Joe Adamov (1920–2005), journalist and presenter for Radio Moscow (later known as Voice of Russia)
- Leonard Adamov (1941–1977), Soviet association football player
- Philippe Adamov (1956–2020), French cartoonist
- Roman Adamov (born 1982), Russian association football player
- Yevgeny Adamov (born 1939), former head of the Russian atomic energy ministry

== Sources ==
- И. М. Ганжина (I. M. Ganzhina). "Словарь современных русских фамилий" (Dictionary of Modern Russian Last Names). Москва, 2001. ISBN 5-237-04101-9
