= Karolinowo, Gmina Nowe Miasto =

Karolinowo
- Village
- Location within Poland
- Coordinates: 52°41′31″N 20°36′12″E
- Country: Poland
- Voivodeship: Masovian
- County: Płońsk
- Gmina: Nowe Miasto

Karolinowo [karɔliˈnɔvɔ] is a village in the administrative district of Gmina Nowe Miasto, within Płońsk County, Masovian Voivodeship, in east-central Poland.
