= Ustronie, Leszno County =

Ustronie
- Village
- Location within Poland
- Coordinates: 51°55′32″N 16°45′14″E
- Country: Poland
- Voivodeship: Greater Poland
- County: Leszno
- Gmina: Osieczna

Ustronie [usˈtrɔɲɛ] is a village in the administrative district of Gmina Osieczna, within Leszno County, Greater Poland Voivodeship, in west-central Poland.
