= Popowo Wonieskie =

- Village
- Location within Poland
- Coordinates: 51°57′N 16°40′E
- Country: Poland
- Voivodeship: Greater Poland
- County: Leszno
- Gmina: Osieczna

Popowo Wonieskie [pɔˈpɔvɔ vɔˈɲɛskʲɛ] is a village in the administrative district of Gmina Osieczna, within Leszno County, Greater Poland Voivodeship, in west-central Poland.
