= Gucin, Płońsk County =

Gucin
- Village
- Location within Poland
- Coordinates: 52°42′07″N 20°35′27″E
- Country: Poland
- Voivodeship: Masovian
- County: Płońsk
- Gmina: Nowe Miasto

Gucin [ˈɡut͡ɕin] is a village in the administrative district of Gmina Nowe Miasto, in Płońsk County, Masovian Voivodeship, in east-central Poland.
