= Gmina Nowe Miasto =

Gmina Nowe Miasto Nowe Miasto Commune
- Gmina
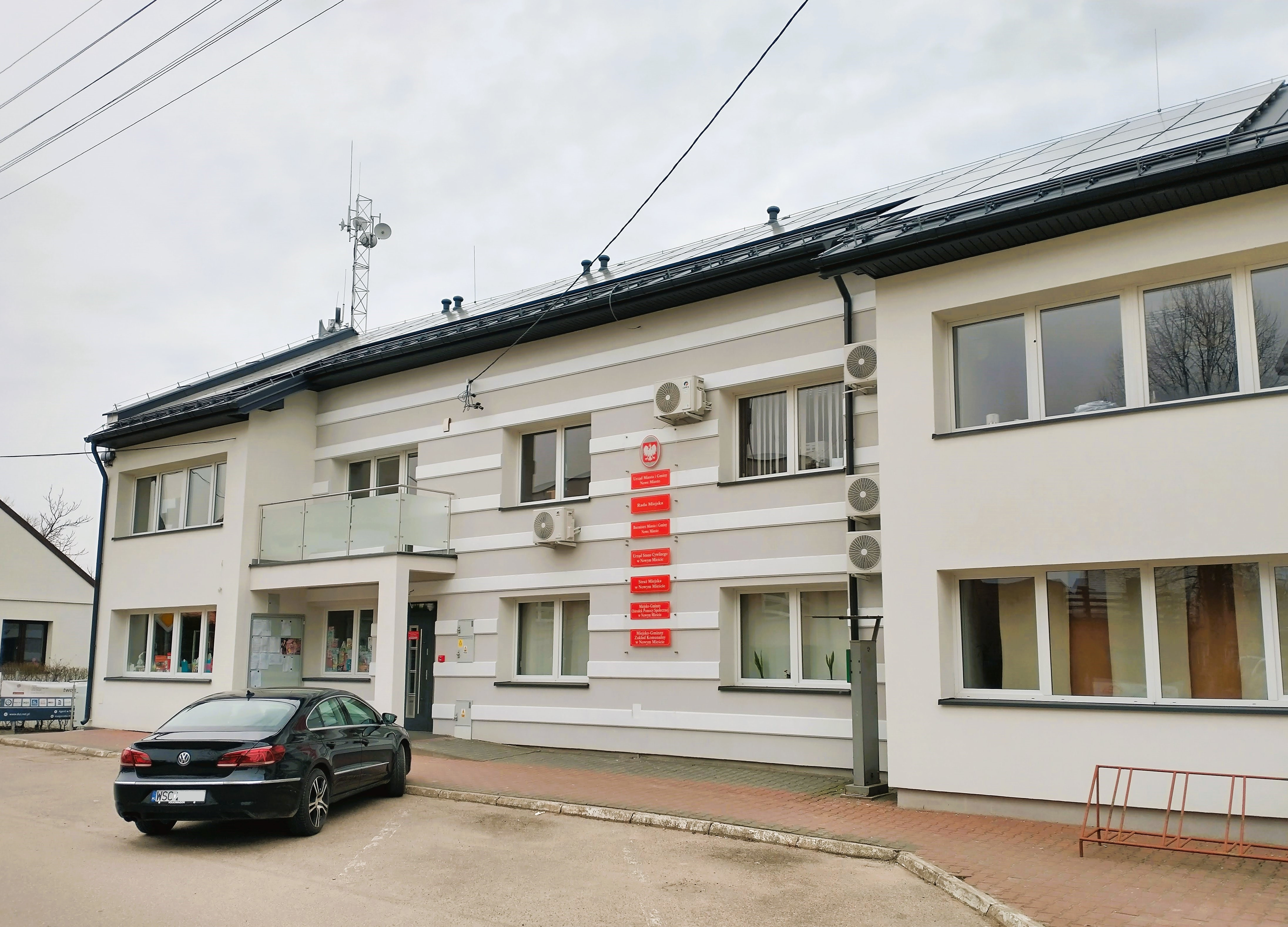
- Municipal hall

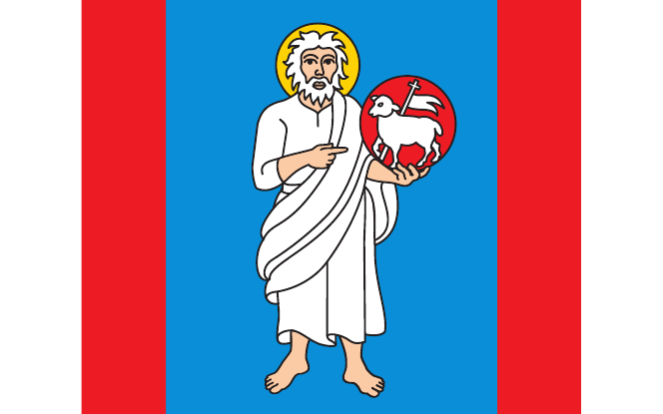
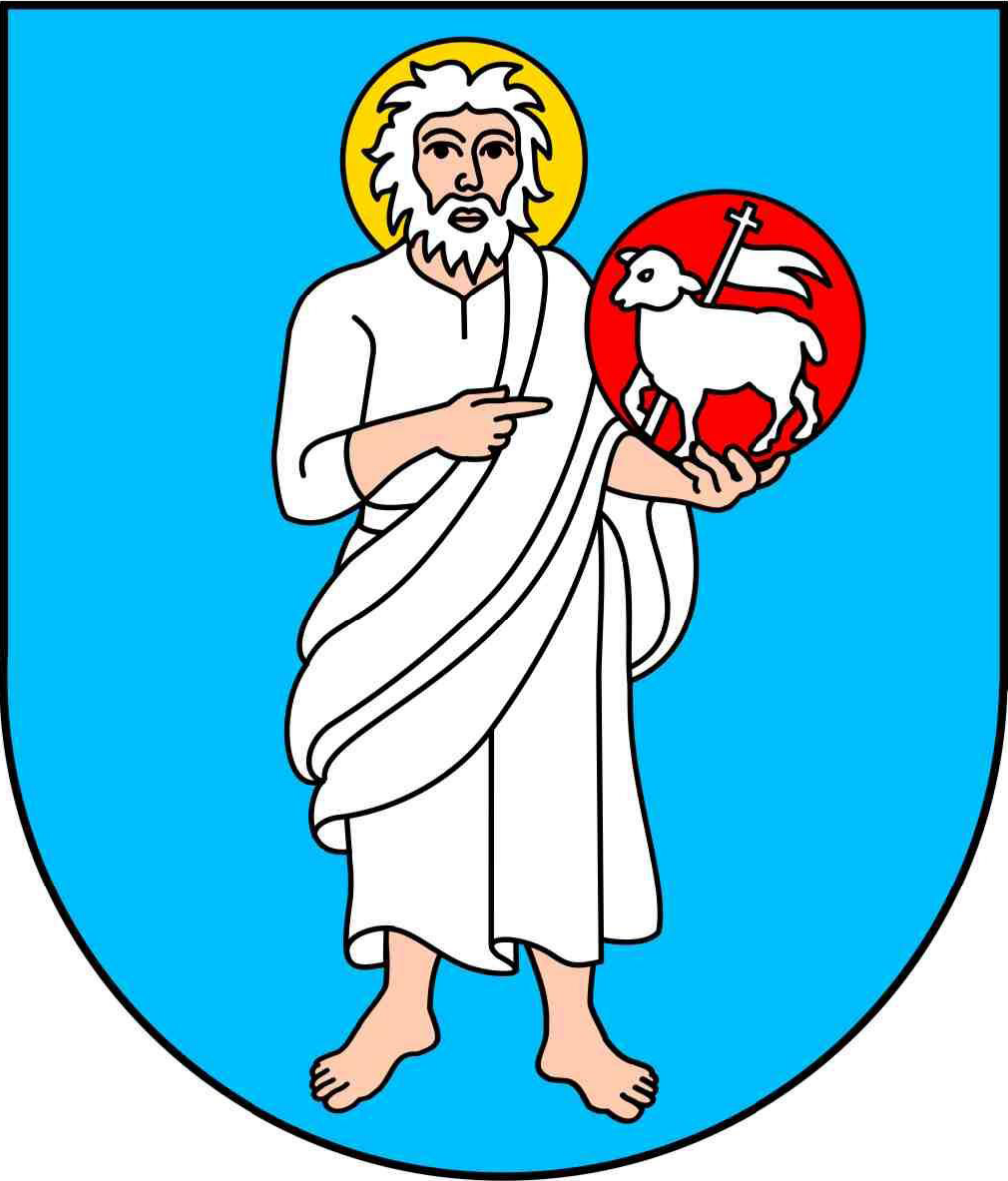
- Flag Coat of arms
- Interactive map of Gmina Nowe Miasto
- Coordinates (Nowe Miasto): 52°39′N 20°38′E
- Country: Poland
- Voivodeship: Masovian
- County: Płońsk
- Seat: Nowe Miasto

Area
  - Total: 118.35 km^{2} (45.70 sq mi)

Population (2013)
  - Total: 4,724
  - Density: 39.92/km^{2} (103.4/sq mi)
- Website: gmina.vip.interia.pl

Gmina Nowe Miasto is a rural gmina (administrative district) in Płońsk County, Masovian Voivodeship, in east-central Poland. Its seat is the village of Nowe Miasto, which lies approximately 17 kilometres (11 mi) north-east of Płońsk and 54 kilometres (34 mi) north-west of Warsaw.

The gmina covers an area of 118.35 square kilometres (45.7 sq mi), and as of 2006 its total population is 4,760 (4,724 in 2013).

== Villages ==
Gmina Nowe Miasto contains the villages and settlements of:

- Adamowo
- Aleksandria
- Anielin
- Belin
- Czarnoty
- Gawłówek
- Gawłowo
- Gościmin Wielki
- Grabie
- Gucin
- Henrykowo
- Janopole
- Jurzyn
- Jurzynek
- Kadłubówka
- Karolinowo
- Kubice
- Latonice
- Miszewo B
- Miszewo Wielkie
- Modzele-Bartłomieje
- Nowe Miasto
- Nowe Miasto-Folwark
- Nowosiółki
- Popielżyn Dolny
- Przepitki
- Rostki
- Salomonka
- Szczawin
- Tomaszewo
- Władysławowo
- Wólka Szczawińska
- Zakobiel
- Zasonie
- Zawady B
- Zawady Stare
- Żołędowo

== Neighbouring gminas ==
Gmina Nowe Miasto is bordered by the gminas of Joniec, Nasielsk, Sochocin, Sońsk and Świercze.
