= Berdychowo, Leszno County =

Berdychowo
- Settlement
- Location within Poland
- Coordinates: 51°54′33″N 16°42′31″E
- Country: Poland
- Voivodeship: Greater Poland
- County: Leszno
- Gmina: Osieczna

Berdychowo [bɛrdɨˈxɔvɔ] is a settlement in the administrative district of Gmina Osieczna, within Leszno County, Greater Poland Voivodeship, in west-central Poland.
