= Adamov (Kutná Hora District) =

- Municipality
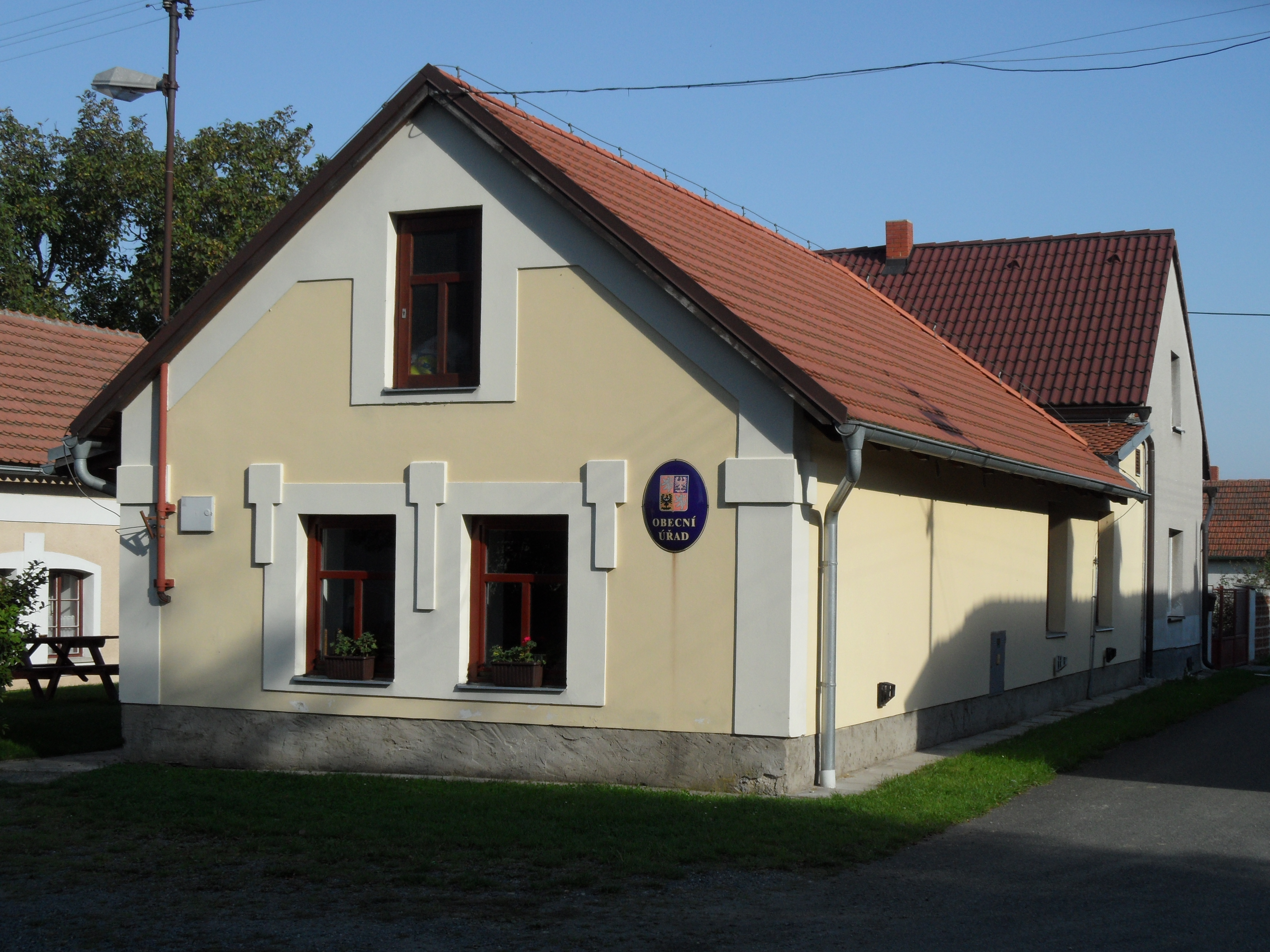
- Municipal office

- Location in the Czech Republic
- Coordinates: 49°51′28″N 15°24′32″E
- Country: Czech Republic
- Region: Central Bohemian
- District: Kutná Hora
- Founded: 1784

Area
  - Total: 2.76 km^{2} (1.07 sq mi)
- Elevation: 306 m (1,004 ft)

Population (2026-01-01)
  - Total: 133
  - Density: 48.2/km^{2} (125/sq mi)
- Time zone: UTC+1 (CET)
  - Summer (DST): UTC+2 (CEST)
- Postal code: 286 01
- Website: www.obecadamov.cz

Adamov is a municipality and village in Kutná Hora District in the Central Bohemian Region of the Czech Republic. It has about 100 inhabitants.

== Etymology ==
The name is derived from the personal name Adam.

== Geography ==
Adamov is located about 14 kilometres (9 mi) southeast of Kutná Hora and 32 km (20 mi) southwest of Pardubice. It lies in the Upper Sázava Hills. The highest point is at 381 m (1,250 ft) above sea level. The municipality is situated on the left bank of the Brslenka Stream.

== History ==
Adamov was founded by Count Jan Adam Auersperg in 1784 and named after him. It was built in the woods as one of the oldest Czech workers' colonies, and most of the houses were made of wood. The inhabitants of the village worked in the textile factory in Tupadly and in the winter they also cut wood.

Adamov was originally a municipal part of Bratčice. From 1960 to 1990, it was part of Tupadly. Since 1990, it has been a separate municipality.

== Demographics ==
Historical population

Year	Pop.	±%
1869	464	—
1880	471	+1.5%
1890	463	−1.7%
1900	457	−1.3%
1910	404	−11.6%

Year	Pop.	±%
1921	375	−7.2%
1930	301	−19.7%
1950	231	−23.3%
1961	226	−2.2%
1970	198	−12.4%

Year	Pop.	±%
1980	152	−23.2%
1991	122	−19.7%
2001	113	−7.4%
2011	112	−0.9%
2021	131	+17.0%

Source: Censuses

== Transport ==
There are no railways or major roads passing through the municipality.

== Sights ==
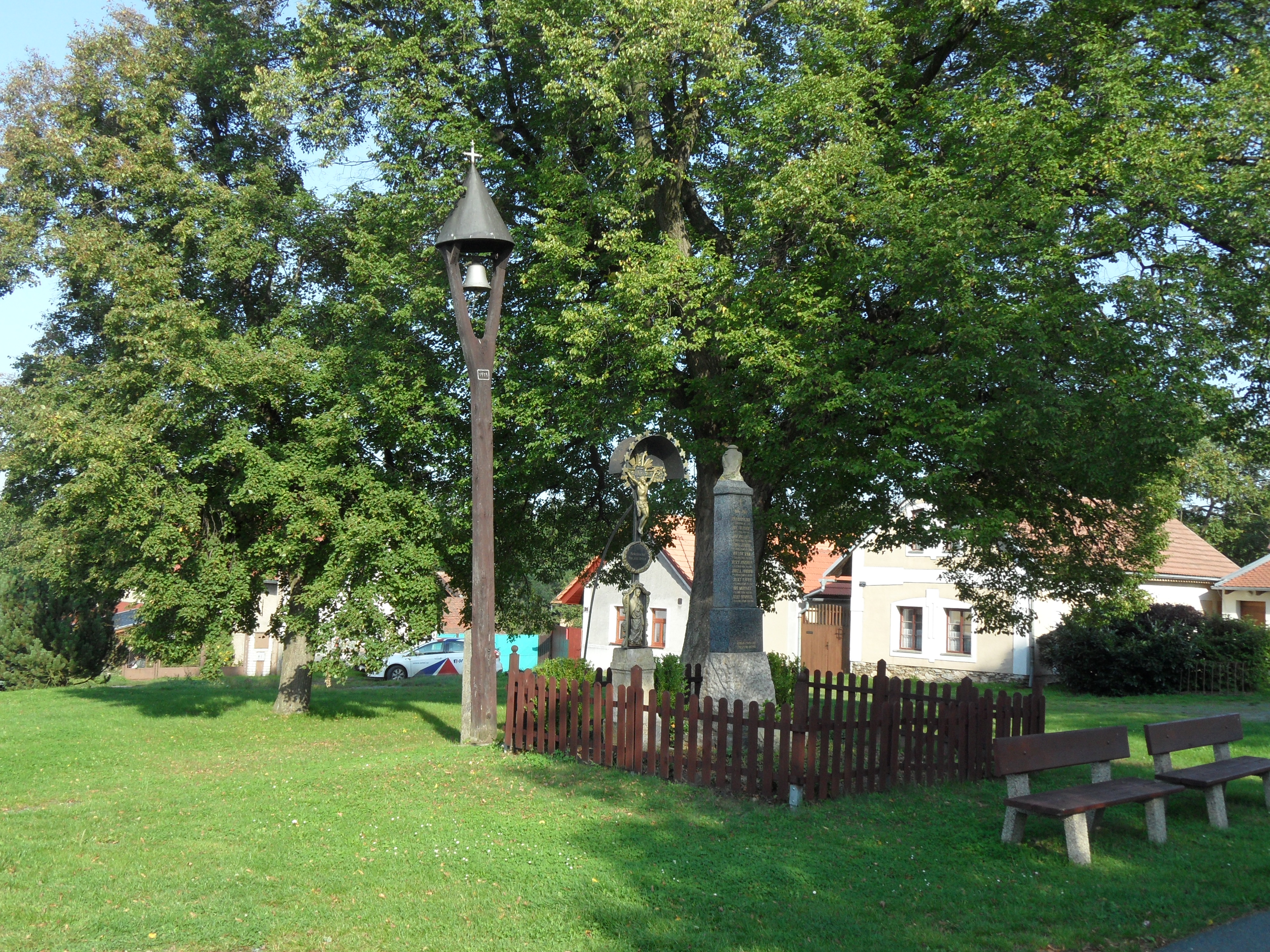
Belfry and memorial to the victims of World War I

There are no protected cultural monuments in the municipality. The oldest building in the village is the former inn No. 19, which was built at the beginning of the 19th century. There is also a small wooden belfry from 1919.
