= Nowe Miasto-Folwark =

- Village
- Location within Poland
- Coordinates: 52°38′56″N 20°38′42″E
- Country: Poland
- Voivodeship: Masovian
- County: Płońsk
- Gmina: Nowe Miasto

Nowe Miasto-Folwark (Polish pronunciation: [ˈnɔvɛ ˈmjastɔ ˈfɔlvark]) is a village in the administrative district of Gmina Nowe Miasto, within Płońsk County, Masovian Voivodeship, in east-central Poland.
