= Szczawin, Płońsk County =

Szczawin
- Village
- Location within Poland
- Coordinates: 52°40′N 20°41′E
- Country: Poland
- Voivodeship: Masovian
- County: Płońsk
- Gmina: Nowe Miasto

Szczawin [ˈʂt͡ʂavin] is a village in the administrative district of Gmina Nowe Miasto, within Płońsk County, Masovian Voivodeship, in east-central Poland.
