= Grabie, Masovian Voivodeship =

Grabie
- Village
- Location within Poland
- Coordinates: 52°37′N 20°37′E
- Country: Poland
- Voivodeship: Masovian
- County: Płońsk
- Gmina: Nowe Miasto

Grabie [ˈɡrabjɛ] is a village in the administrative district of Gmina Nowe Miasto, within Płońsk County, Masovian Voivodeship, in east-central Poland.
