= Gmina Osieczna, Greater Poland Voivodeship =

Gmina Osieczna Osieczna Commune
- Gmina
- Coat of arms
- Interactive map of Gmina Osieczna
- Coordinates (Osieczna): 51°54′21″N 16°40′35″E
- Country: Poland
- Voivodeship: Greater Poland
- County: Leszno County
- Seat: Osieczna

Area
  - Total: 128.73 km^{2} (49.70 sq mi)

Population (2006)
  - Total: 8,576
  - Density: 66.62/km^{2} (172.5/sq mi)
  - Urban: 2,018
  - Rural: 6,558
- Website: http://www.osieczna.pl/

Gmina Osieczna is an urban-rural gmina (administrative district) in Leszno County, Greater Poland Voivodeship, in west-central Poland. Its seat is the town of Osieczna, which lies approximately 10 kilometres (6 mi) north-east of Leszno and 58 km (36 mi) south of the regional capital Poznań.

The gmina covers an area of 128.73 square kilometres (49.7 sq mi), and as of 2006 its total population is 8,576 (out of which the population of Osieczna amounts to 2,018, and the population of the rural part of the gmina is 6,558).

== Villages ==
Apart from the town of Osieczna, Gmina Osieczna contains the villages and settlements of Adamowo, Berdychowo, Chmielkowo, Dobramyśl, Drzeczkowo, Frankowo, Górka, Grodzisko, Jeziorki, Kąkolewo, Kąty, Kleszczewo, Kopanina, Łoniewo, Maciejewo, Miąskowo, Nowe Wolkowo, Popowo Wonieskie, Świerczyna, Trzebania, Ustronie, Witosław, Wojnowice, Wolkowo and Ziemnice.

== Neighbouring gminas ==
Gmina Osieczna is bordered by the city of Leszno and by the gminas of Krzemieniewo, Krzywiń, Lipno, Rydzyna and Śmigiel.
