= Nowe Miasto, Płońsk County =

Nowe Miasto
- Town
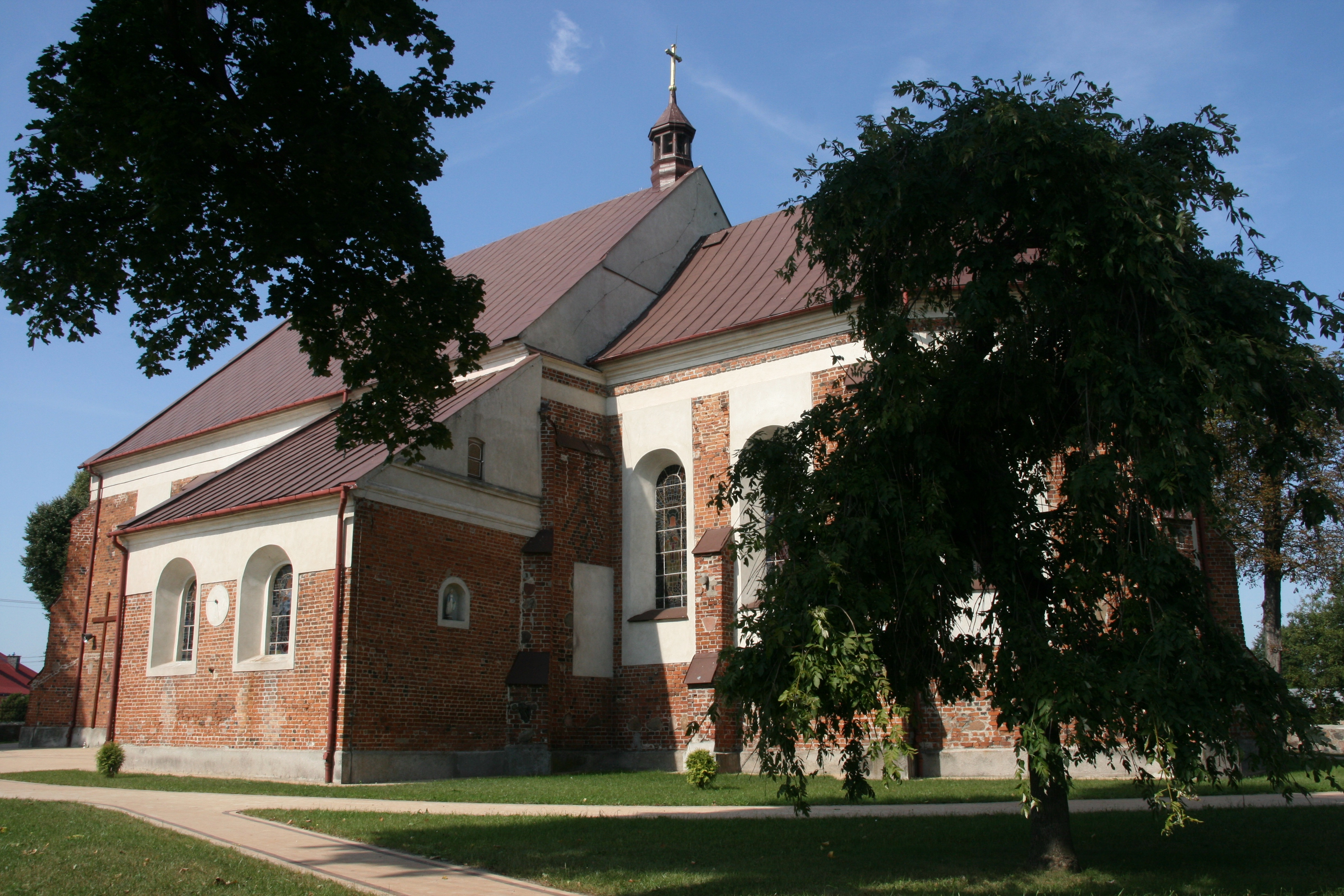
- Gothic Holy Trinity church in Nowe Miasto

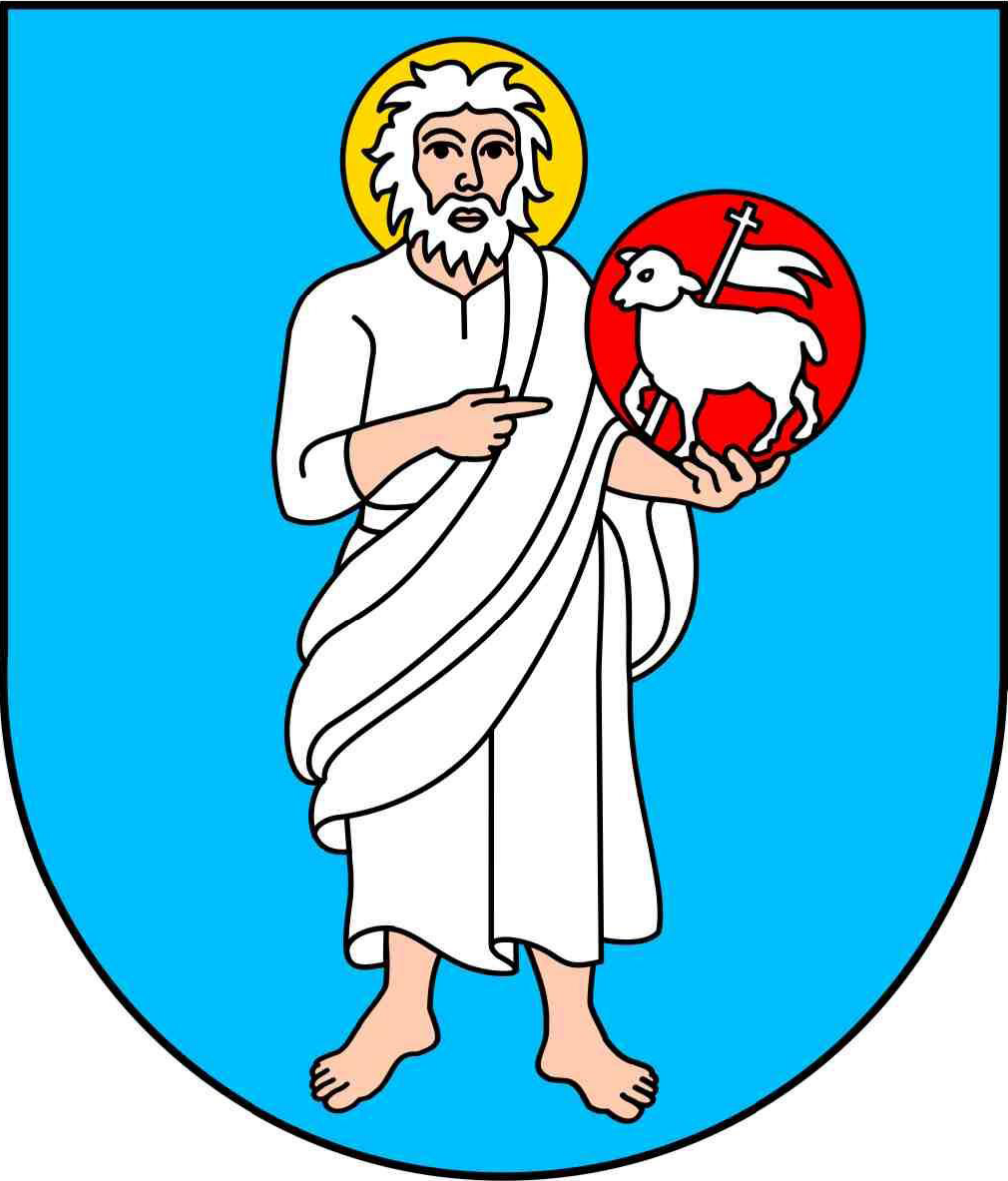
- Coat of arms

- Location within Poland
- Coordinates: 52°39′N 20°38′E
- Country: Poland
- Voivodeship: Masovian
- County: Płońsk
- Gmina: Nowe Miasto
- Town rights: 1420

Population
  - Total: 2,000
- Time zone: UTC+1 (CET)
  - Summer (DST): UTC+2 (CEST)
- Postal code: 09-120
- Vehicle registration: WPN

Nowe Miasto (Polish pronunciation: [ˈnɔvɛ ˈmjastɔ]) is a town in Płońsk County, Masovian Voivodeship, in east-central Poland. It is the seat of the gmina (administrative district) called Gmina Nowe Miasto.

The town has a population of 2,000. Its name means "new town".

It was a county seat and royal town of the Kingdom of Poland, administratively located in the Masovian Voivodeship in the Greater Poland Province.
