= Gawłowo =

- Village
- Location within Poland
- Coordinates: 52°36′45″N 20°43′18″E
- Country: Poland
- Voivodeship: Masovian
- County: Płońsk
- Gmina: Nowe Miasto

Gawłowo [ɡaˈvwɔvɔ] is a village in the administrative district of Gmina Nowe Miasto, within Płońsk County, Masovian Voivodeship, in east-central Poland.
