= Gościmin Wielki =

- Village
- Location within Poland
- Coordinates: 52°42′14″N 20°38′44″E
- Country: Poland
- Voivodeship: Masovian
- County: Płońsk
- Gmina: Nowe Miasto

Gościmin Wielki (Polish pronunciation: [ɡɔɕˈt͡ɕimin ˈvjɛlkʲi]) is a village in the administrative district of Gmina Nowe Miasto, within Płońsk County, Masovian Voivodeship, in east-central Poland.
