= Rostki, Płońsk County =

Rostki
- Village
- Location within Poland
- Coordinates: 52°37′N 20°41′E
- Country: Poland
- Voivodeship: Masovian
- County: Płońsk
- Gmina: Nowe Miasto

Rostki [ˈrɔstki] is a village in the administrative district of Gmina Nowe Miasto, within Płońsk County, Masovian Voivodeship, in east-central Poland.
