= Kopanina, Leszno County =

Kopanina
- Settlement
- Location within Poland
- Coordinates: 51°56′40″N 16°40′14″E
- Country: Poland
- Voivodeship: Greater Poland
- County: Leszno
- Gmina: Osieczna

Kopanina [kɔpaˈnina] is a settlement in the administrative district of Gmina Osieczna, within Leszno County, Greater Poland Voivodeship, in west-central Poland.
