= Kąty, Leszno County =

Kąty
- Village
- Location within Poland
- Coordinates: 51°57′19″N 16°44′37″E
- Country: Poland
- Voivodeship: Greater Poland
- County: Leszno
- Gmina: Osieczna

Kąty [ˈkɔntɨ] is a village in the administrative district of Gmina Osieczna, within Leszno County, Greater Poland Voivodeship, in west-central Poland.
