= Chmielkowo =

- Village
- Location within Poland
- Coordinates: 51°54′40″N 16°48′11″E
- Country: Poland
- Voivodeship: Greater Poland
- County: Leszno
- Gmina: Osieczna

Chmielkowo [xmjɛlˈkɔvɔ] is a village in the administrative district of Gmina Osieczna, within Leszno County, Greater Poland Voivodeship, in west-central Poland.
