= Miszewo B =

- Village
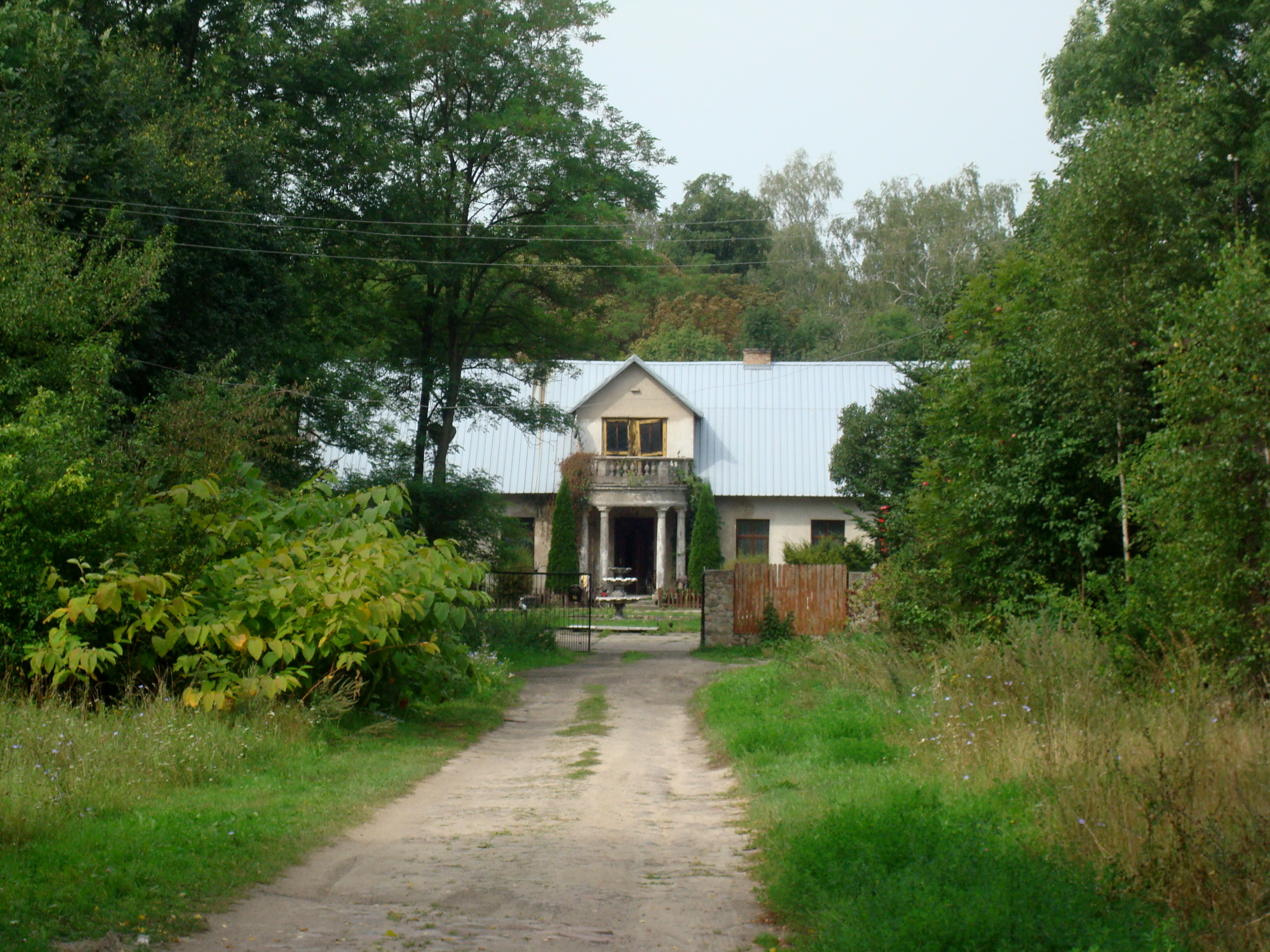

- Location within Poland
- Coordinates: 52°37′55″N 20°38′17″E
- Country: Poland
- Voivodeship: Masovian
- County: Płońsk
- Gmina: Nowe Miasto

Miszewo B is a village in the administrative district of Gmina Nowe Miasto, within Płońsk County, Masovian Voivodeship, in east-central Poland.
