= Kleszczewo, Leszno County =

Kleszczewo
- Village
- Location within Poland
- Coordinates: 51°55′29″N 16°48′16″E
- Country: Poland
- Voivodeship: Greater Poland
- County: Leszno
- Gmina: Osieczna

Kleszczewo [klɛʂˈt͡ʂɛvɔ] is a village in the administrative district of Gmina Osieczna, within Leszno County, Greater Poland Voivodeship, in west-central Poland.
