= Jeziorki, Leszno County =

Jeziorki
- Village
- Location within Poland
- Coordinates: 51°54′4″N 16°39′2″E
- Country: Poland
- Voivodeship: Greater Poland
- County: Leszno
- Gmina: Osieczna

Jeziorki [jɛˈʑɔrki] is a village in the administrative district of Gmina Osieczna, within Leszno County, Greater Poland Voivodeship, in west-central Poland.
