= Frankowo, Greater Poland Voivodeship =

Frankowo
- Village
- Location within Poland
- Coordinates: 51°53′N 16°45′E
- Country: Poland
- Voivodeship: Greater Poland
- County: Leszno
- Gmina: Osieczna

Frankowo [franˈkɔvɔ] is a village in the administrative district of Gmina Osieczna, within Leszno County, Greater Poland Voivodeship, in west-central Poland.
