= Gawłówek, Masovian Voivodeship =

Village in Gmina Nowe Miasto, Poland

Gawłówek
- Village
- Location within Poland
- Coordinates: 52°36′40.42″N 20°42′3.71″E
- Country: Poland
- Voivodeship: Masovian
- County: Płońsk
- Gmina: Nowe Miasto

Gawłówek [ɡaˈvwuvɛk] is a village in the administrative district of Gmina Nowe Miasto, within Płońsk County, Masovian Voivodeship, in east-central Poland.
