= Żołędowo, Masovian Voivodeship =

Żołędowo
- Village
- Location within Poland
- Coordinates: 52°35′07″N 20°37′51″E
- Country: Poland
- Voivodeship: Masovian
- County: Płońsk
- Gmina: Nowe Miasto

Żołędowo [ʐɔwɛnˈdɔvɔ] is a village in the administrative district of Gmina Nowe Miasto, within Płońsk County, Masovian Voivodeship, in east-central Poland.
