= Adamowski =

Adamowski (feminine Adamowska) is a Polish surname. Notable people with the surname include:

- Ben Adamowski (1906–1982), American politician
- Tadeusz Adamowski (1909–1994), Polish-American ice hockey player
- Timothee Adamowski (1858–1913), Polish-American conductor
- Helenka Adamowska-Pantaleoni (1900–1987), Polish-American humanitarian and founding director of U.S. Fund for UNICEF (sister of Tadeusz Adamowski and niece of Timothee Adamowski)
