= Adamovo, Velike Lašče =

Adamovo
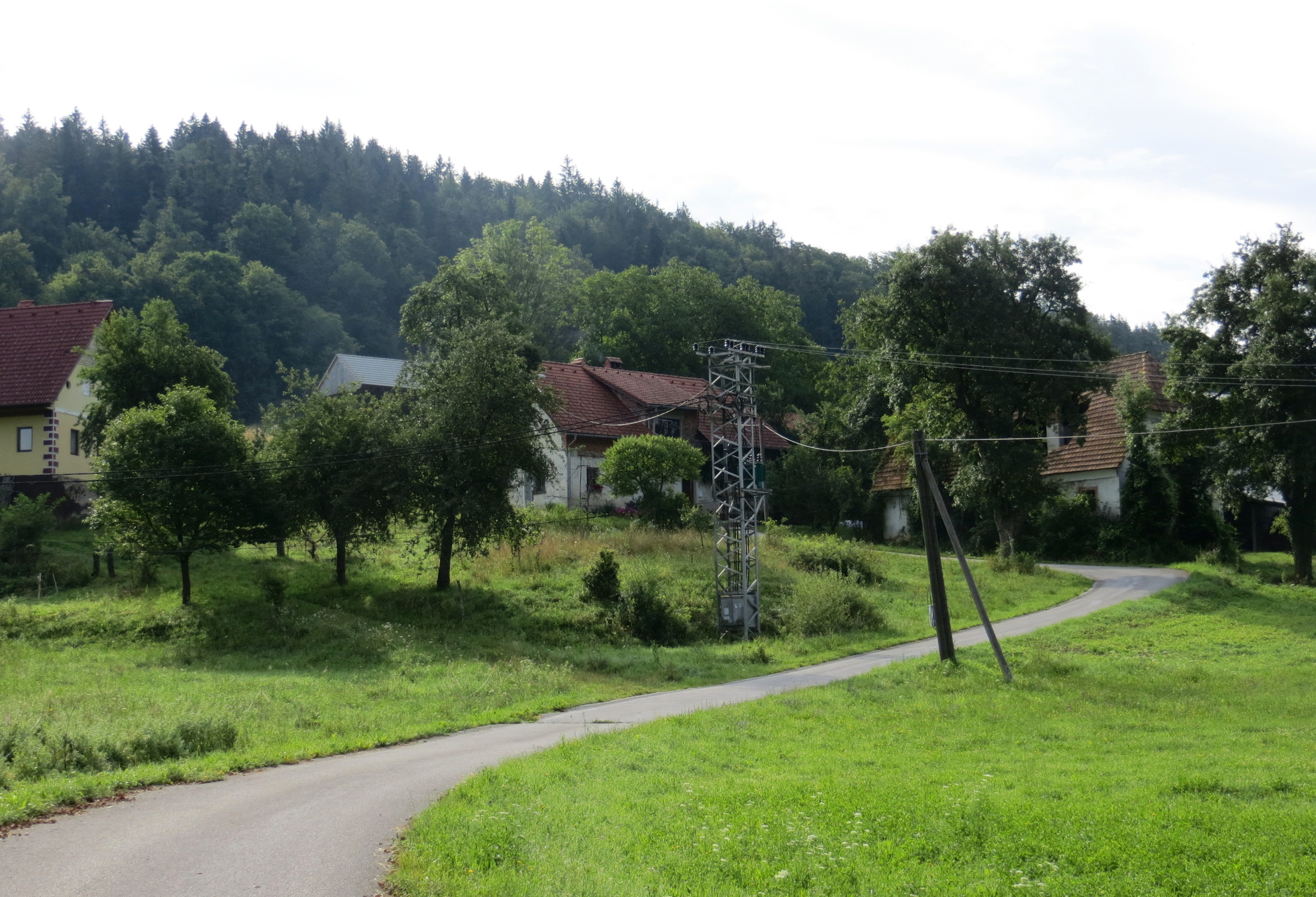

- Location in Slovenia
- Coordinates: 45°49′26.23″N 14°36′18.03″E
- Country: Slovenia
- Traditional region: Lower Carniola
- Statistical region: Central Slovenia
- Municipality: Velike Lašče

Area
  - Total: 0.6 km^{2} (0.23 sq mi)
- Elevation: 514.4 m (1,688 ft)

Population (2002)
  - Total: 13
- Postal code: 1315

Adamovo (pronounced [aˈdaːmɔʋɔ]; German: Adamou) is a small settlement in the Municipality of Velike Lašče in Slovenia. The area is part of the traditional region of Lower Carniola and is now included in the Central Slovenia Statistical Region.

== Name ==
The name Adamovo is derived from an estate name, referring to an isolated farm known as Adam that the village developed from.
