= Tupadly (Kutná Hora District) =

- Municipality
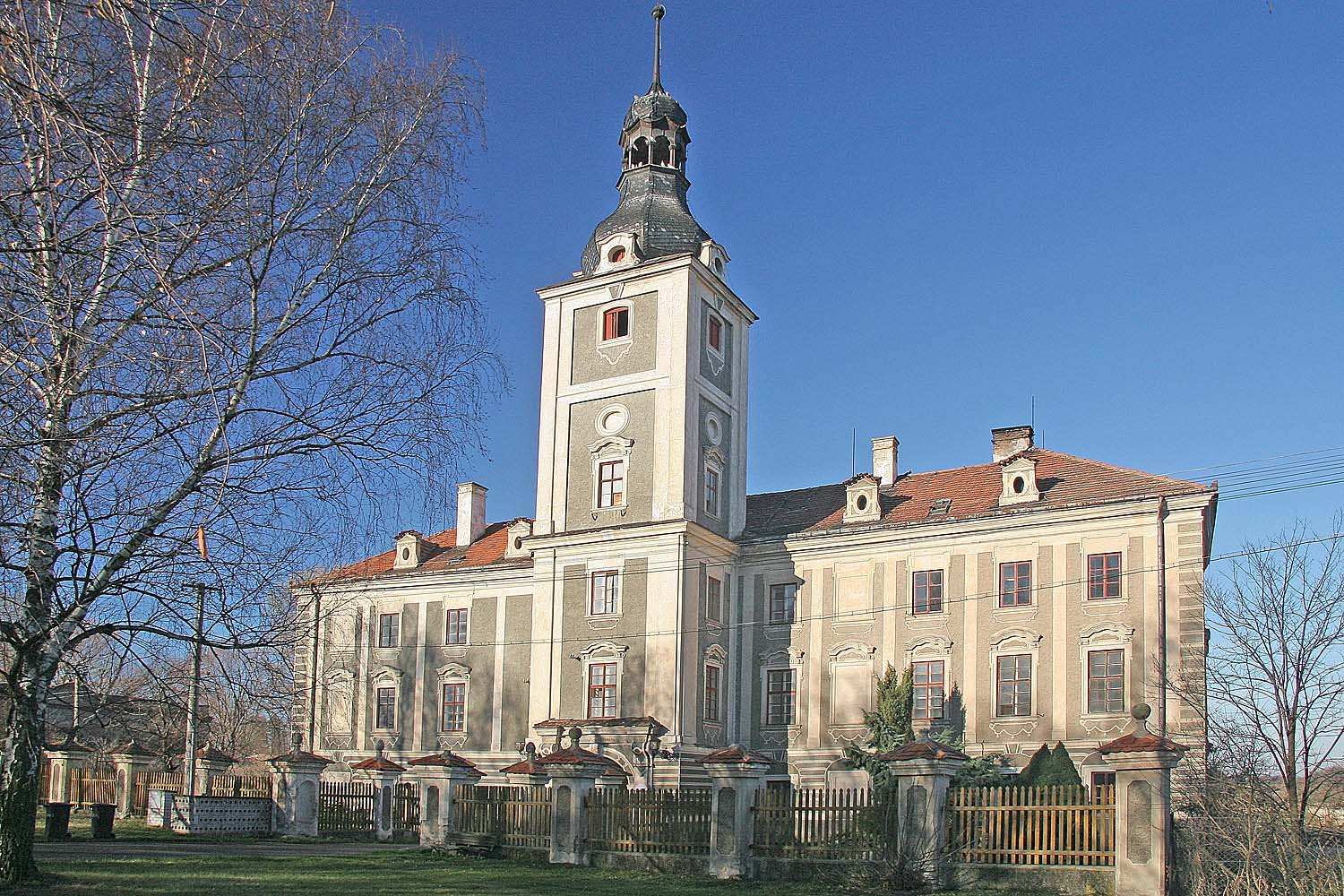
- Tupadly Castle

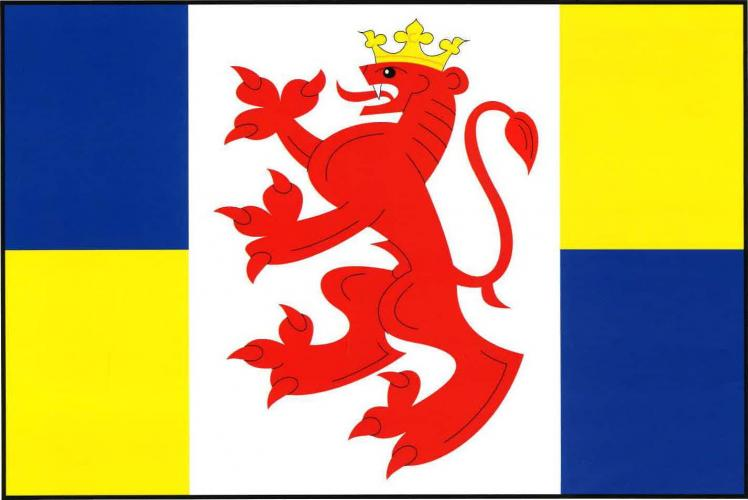
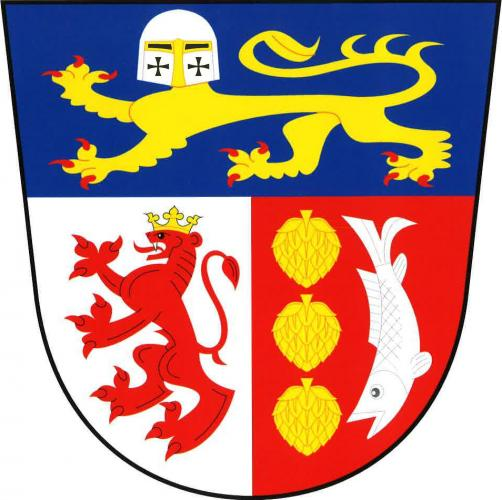
- Flag Coat of arms

- Location in the Czech Republic
- Coordinates: 49°52′9″N 15°24′13″E
- Country: Czech Republic
- Region: Central Bohemian
- District: Kutná Hora
- First mentioned: 1242

Area
  - Total: 6.60 km^{2} (2.55 sq mi)
- Elevation: 256 m (840 ft)

Population (2026-01-01)
  - Total: 683
  - Density: 103/km^{2} (268/sq mi)
- Time zone: UTC+1 (CET)
  - Summer (DST): UTC+2 (CEST)
- Postal code: 285 63
- Website: www.tupadly.cz

Tupadly is a municipality and village in Kutná Hora District in the Central Bohemian Region of the Czech Republic. It has about 700 inhabitants.

== Demographics ==
Historical population
Year	Pop.	±%
1869	705	—
1880	783	+11.1%
1890	764	−2.4%
1900	757	−0.9%
1910	728	−3.8%
1921	772	+6.0%
1930	709	−8.2%
1950	547	−22.8%
1961	540	−1.3%
1970	527	−2.4%
1980	522	−0.9%
1991	517	−1.0%
2001	511	−1.2%
2011	607	+18.8%
2021	640	+5.4%
Source: Censuses
