= Adamowo, Gmina Osieczna =

Adamowo
- Settlement
- Location within Poland
- Coordinates: 52°26′26.06″N 18°3′42.47″E
- Country: Poland
- Voivodeship: Greater Poland
- County: Leszno
- Gmina: Osieczna

Adamowo [adaˈmɔvɔ] is a settlement in the administrative district of Gmina Osieczna, within Leszno County, Greater Poland Voivodeship, in west-central Poland.
