= Adamovsky District =

Adamovsky District Адамовский район (Russian)
- District
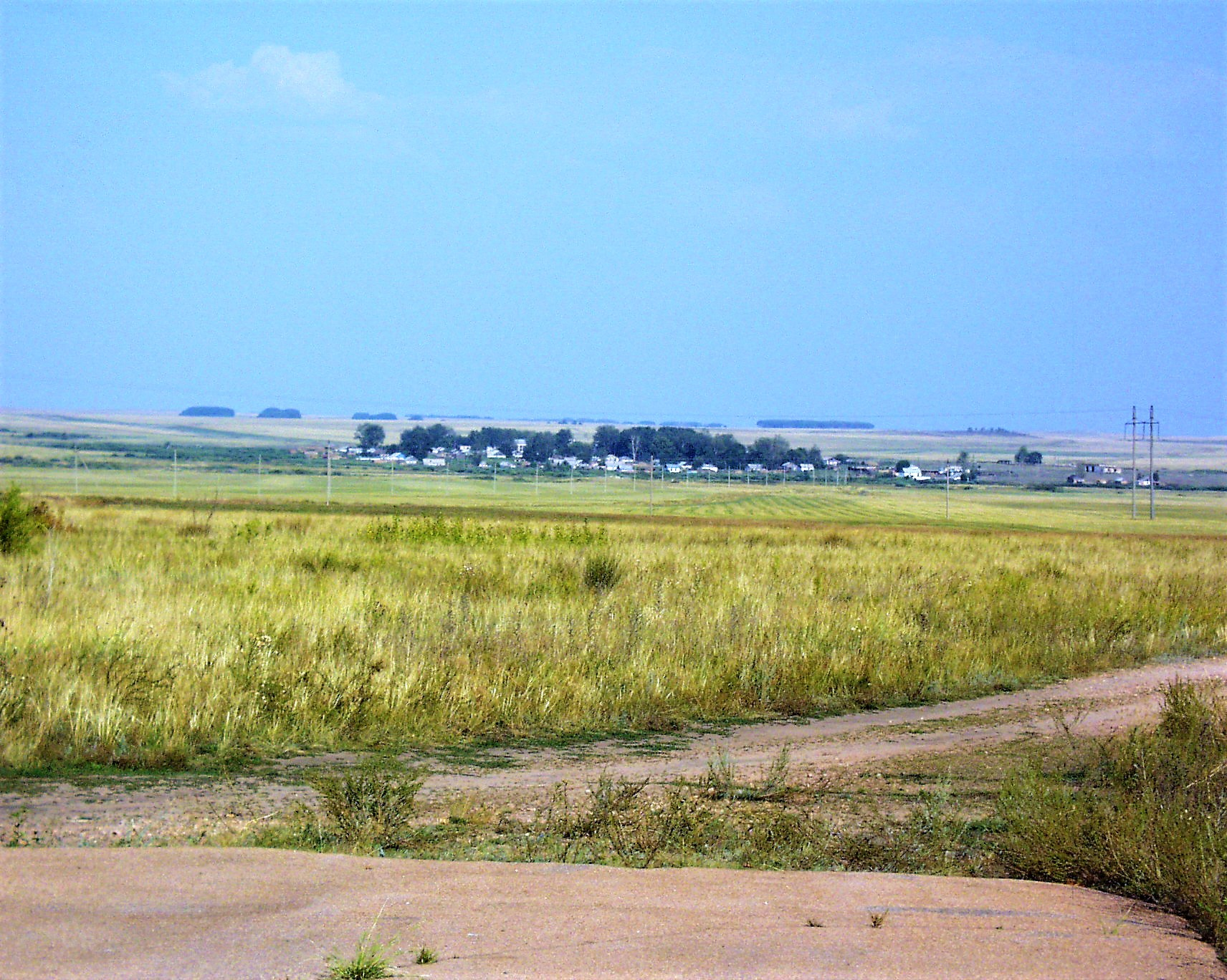
- Village Karabutak, Adamovsky District

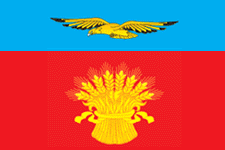
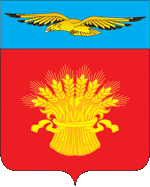
- Flag Coat of arms
- Location of Adamovsky District in Orenburg Oblast
- Coordinates: 51°30′58″N 59°56′12″E
- Country: Russia
- Federal subject: Orenburg Oblast
- Established: 1 April 1921
- Administrative center: Adamovka

Area
  - Total: 6,500 km^{2} (2,500 sq mi)

Population (2010 Census)
  - Total: 26,079
  - Density: 4.0/km^{2} (10/sq mi)
  - Urban: 0%
  - Rural: 100%

Administrative structure
  - Administrative divisions: 12 Selsoviets
  - Inhabited localities: 40 rural localities

Municipal structure
  - Municipally incorporated as: Adamovsky Municipal District
  - Municipal divisions: 0 urban settlements, 11 rural settlements
- Time zone: UTC+5 (MSK+2)
- OKTMO ID: 53604000
- Website: http://mo-ad.orb.ru/

Adamovsky District (Russian: Ада́мовский райо́н; Kazakh: Адамау ауданы, Adamau audany) is an administrative and municipal district (raion), one of the thirty-five in Orenburg Oblast, Russia. It is located in the east of the oblast. The area of the district is 6,500 square kilometers (2,500 sq mi). Its administrative center is the rural locality (a settlement) of Adamovka. The population as of the 2010 Census was 26,079. 31,133 (2002 census); 29,608 (1989 Soviet census). The population of Adamovka accounts for 29.7% of the total district's population.
