= Adamovka, Adamovsky District, Orenburg Oblast =

Adamovka Адамовка
- Settlement
- Interactive map of Adamovka
- Location of Adamovka Adamovka (Orenburg Oblast)
- Coordinates: 51°31′24″N 59°56′04″E
- Country: Russia
- Federal subject: Orenburg Oblast
- Administrative district: Adamovsky District
- SettlementSelsoviet: Adamovka Settlement
- Founded: 1902
- Elevation: 284 m (932 ft)

Population (2010 Census)
  - Total: 7,733
  - Estimate (2021): 8,288 (+7.2%)

Administrative status
  - Capital of: Adamovsky District, Adamovka Settlement

Municipal status
  - Municipal district: Adamovsky Municipal District
  - Rural settlement: Adamovsky Possovet Rural Settlement
  - Capital of: Adamovsky Municipal District, Adamovsky Possovet Rural Settlement
- Time zone: UTC+5 (MSK+2)
- Postal codes: 462830, 462831, 62820
- OKTMO ID: 53604401101

Adamovka (Russian: Адамовка; Kazakh: Адамау, Adamaý) is a rural locality (a settlement) and the administrative center of Adamovsky District of Orenburg Oblast, Russia. Population: 7,733 (2010 census); 8,038 (2002 census); 7,717 (1989 Soviet census).
