= Ezequiel Adamovsky =

Argentine historian and political activist

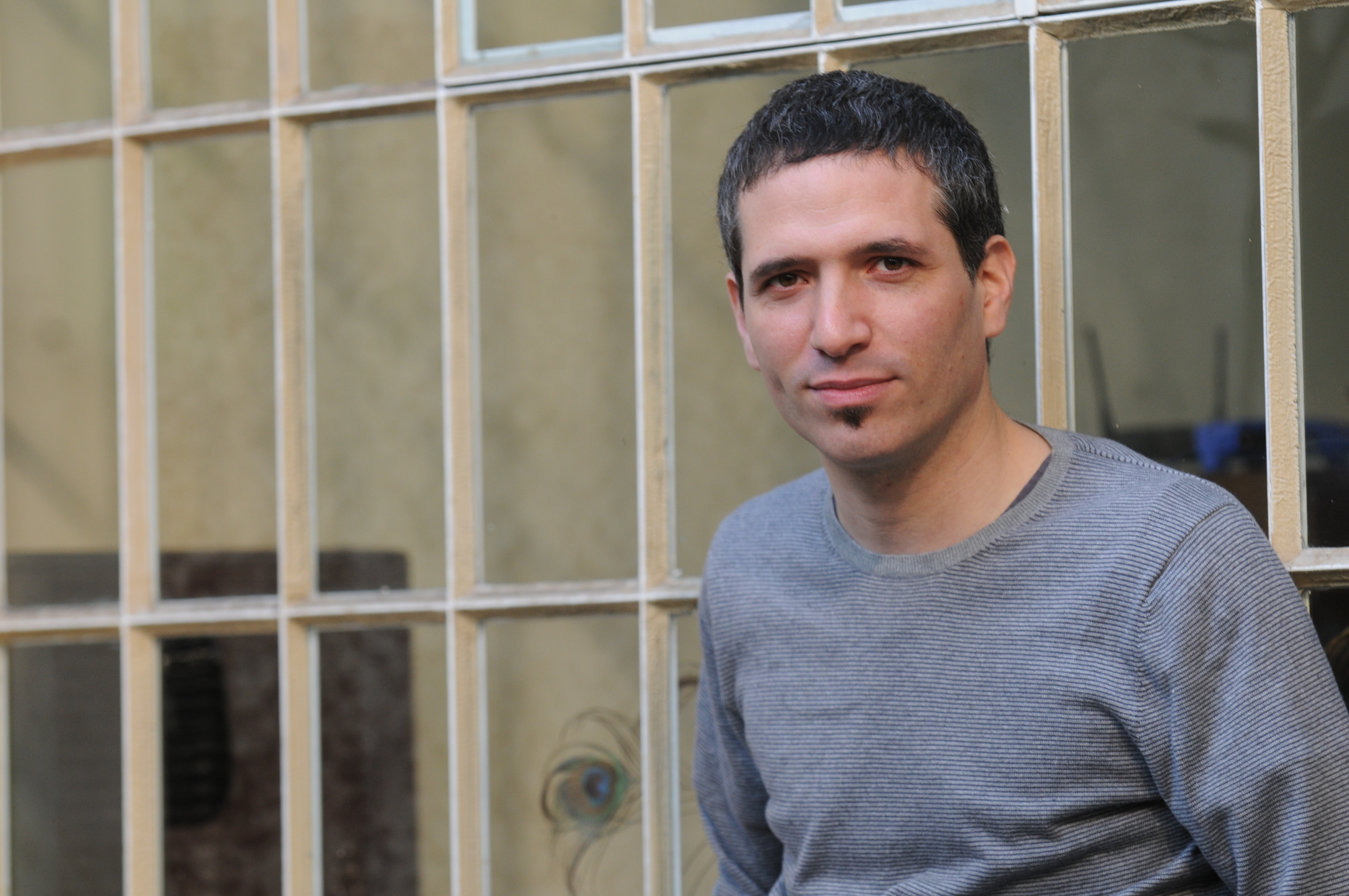
Ezequiel Adamovsky, 2009

Ezequiel Adamovsky (born 1971) is an Argentine historian and political activist who has written many articles and books about intellectual history, globalization, anti-capitalism and left-wing politics. He is a professor at both the University of San Martín and the University of Buenos Aires. He is also a researcher, working for the National Council for Scientific and Technological Research and the CNRS. He has been nominated for and received many awards for his writing, including the Iberoamerican Book Award, which he received in 2020.
