= Leonard Adamov =

Soviet footballer

Personal information
- Full name: Leonard Illarionovich Adamov
- Date of birth: 10 March 1941
- Place of birth: Odessa, USSR
- Date of death: 9 November 1977 (aged 36)
- Place of death: Minsk, USSR
- Height: 1.62 m (5 ft 4 in)
- Position: Forward

Youth career
- 1959: Spartak Moscow

Senior career*
| Years | Team | Apps | (Gls) |
| 1960–1962 | Spartak Moscow | 30 | (4) |
| 1963–1970 | Dinamo Minsk | 228 | (26) |
| 1974–1975 | Dinamo Minsk (reserves) | | |

International career
| 1965 | USSR | 1 | (0) |

Managerial career
- 1971–1972: Gomselmash Gomel
- 1974–1977: Dinamo Minsk (assistant)
- * Club domestic league appearances and goals

Leonard Illarionovich Adamov (Russian: Леонард Илларионович Адамов, Ukrainian: Леонард Ілларіонович Адамов; 10 March 1941 – 9 November 1977) was a Ukrainian and Soviet football player. He committed suicide by jumping out of his apartment window.

== Honours ==
- Soviet Top League winner: 1962.

== International career ==
Adamov played his only game for USSR on 4 September 1965 in a friendly against Yugoslavia.
