= Adamovka, Republic of Bashkortostan =

Adamovka Адамовка
- Village
- Location within Bashkortostan Location within Russia
- Coordinates: 54°07′N 54°38′E
- Country: Russia
- Region: Bashkortostan
- District: Alsheyevsky District
- Time zone: UTC+5:00

Adamovka (Russian: Адамовка) is a rural locality (a village) in Truntaishevsky Selsoviet, Alsheyevsky District, Bashkortostan, Russia. The population was 1 as of 2010. There is 1 street.

== Geography ==
Adamovka is located 30 km northwest of Rayevsky (the district's administrative centre) by road. Ustyevka is the nearest rural locality.
