= Adamovo, Republic of Buryatia =

Adamovo Адамово
- Selo
- Location within Republic of Buryatia Location within Russia
- Coordinates: 53°28′N 109°18′E
- Country: Russia
- Region: Republic of Buryatia
- District: Barguzinsky District
- Time zone: UTC+8:00

Adamovo (Russian: Адамово) is a rural locality (a selo) in Barguzinsky District, Republic of Buryatia, Russia. The population was 185 as of 2010. There are 4 streets.

== Geography ==
Adamovo is located 29 km southwest of Barguzin (the district's administrative centre) by road. Zorino is the nearest rural locality.
