= List of Polish comital families =

== Families ==
| # | Name | Coat of arms | Title recognition | Remarks |
|---|---|---|---|---|
| 1 | Aleksandrowicz | Kosy | G 1800, R 1847; K.P. | died out |
| 2 | Ankwicz | Abdank | G 1778, K.P. | died out |
| 3 | Badeni | Bończa | A 1846, 1887; K.P. | |
| 4 | Batowski | Trzy zęby | | died out |
| 5 | Baworowski | Prus II | G 1779 | |
| 6 | Bąkowski/Bonkowski | Gryf | G 1782 | |
| 7 | Bieliński | Szeliga | P 1798 | died out |
| 8 | Bieliński | Junosza | K.P. 1825 | died out |
| 9 | Bielski | Jelita | G 1778; A 1895 | died out (male line) |
| 10 | Bniński | Łodzia | P 1798, 1816; K.P. | |
| 11 | Bobrowski | Jastrzębiec | G 1800; R 1844; K.P. | |
| 12 | Borch | Trzy Kawki | S.I.R. 1783, R. 1843, 1853, 1854, 1858, 1882 | |
| 13 | Borkowski | Junosza | A. 1866 | |
| 15 | Dunin-Borkowski | Łabędź | G 1819, 1828, K.P. | |
| 16 | Branicki | Korczak | R 1839 | died out (male line) |
| 17 | Breza | Breza | S 1889 | |
| 18 | Broniec | Broniec | K.P. | died out |
| 19 | Brzostowski | Strzemię | P 1798; R 1846; K.P. | died out |
| 20 | Brzozowski | Belina | S.A. 1897 | |
| 21 | Bukowski | Ossorya | G 1783 | died out |
| 22 | Butler | Butler III | P 1651 | |
| 23 | Bystrzanowski | Starykoń | G 1801; P 1803 | died out |
| 24 | Cetner | Przerowa | G 1780 | died out |
| 25 | Charczewski | Cholewa | G 1783 | died out |
| 26 | Chodkiewicz de Młynów | Chodkiewicz | Rz.O. 1568; K.P. | |
| 27 | Myszka-Chołoniewski | Chołoniewski | G 1798 | |
| 28 | Cieszkowski | Dołęga | S.A. 1850(?); P 1854 | died out |
| 29 | Czacki | Świnka | R 1897 | |
| 30 | Hutten-Czapski | Hutten-Czapski | P 1804, 1861; R 1874, 1895, 1900 | |
| 31 | Czarnecki | Prus III | P 1854, 1857; S.A 1898 | title expired |
| 32 | Czosnowski | Kolumna | I 1887; S.A. 1897 | died out |
| 33 | Dąmbski | Godziemba | P 1825, 1826; K.P. | title expired / died out |
| 34 | Dembiński | Rawicz | G 1784 | died out |
| 35 | Dębicki | Gryf | G 1789 | died out |
| 36 | Działyński | Ogończyk | P 1786; K.P | died out |
| 37 | Dzieduszycki | Sas | G 1775; P 1826; I 1906; K.P. | |
| 38 | Dzierzbicki | Topór | K.P. | died out |
| 40 | Flemming | Fleming | S.I.R. 1700, 1721 | Polish line died out |
| 41 | Fredro | Bończa | G 1822; K.P. | died out |
| 42 | Garczyński | Garczyński | P 1839 | died out |
| 43 | Gasztołd | Abdank | | died out |
| 44 | Giżycki | Gozdawa | K.P. | title expired |
| 45 | Golejewski | Kościesza | G 1783 | died out |
| 46 | Gołuchowski | Leliwa | G 1783 | |
| 47 | Gomoliński | Jelita | K.P. | |
| 48 | Ostroróg-Gorzeński | Nałęcz | P 1774; S.A. 1886 | |
| 49 | Grabowski | Topór | P 1816; R 1836, 1840, 1844, 1887; KP | |
| 50 | Goetzendorf-Grabowski | Zbiświcz | P 1786, 1840 | |
| 51 | Grocholski | Syrokomla | R 1881, 1898 | |
| 52 | Grodzicki | Łada | G 1786; K.P. | |
| 53 | Grudziński | Grzymała | P 1786 | |
| 54 | Grzembski | Jastrzębiec | G 1806 | |
| 55 | Grzembski | Dołęga | G 1804 | |
| 56 | Gurowski | Wczele | P 1844; Ang. ?; K.P. | |
| 57 | Gutakowski | Gutak | K.P. | |
| 58 | Hauke-Bosak | Bosak | R 1829, 1830, 1838, 1850 | |
| 59 | Humnicki | Gozdawa | G 1790 | |
| 60 | Husarzewski | Husarzewski | P 1814; K.P.; A 1838 | |
| 61 | Iliński | Lis | R 1850, 1897 | |
| 62 | Jabłonowski | Grzymała | G 1779 | |
| 63 | Jarczewski | Zaremba | P 1810 | |
| 64 | Jaworski | Sas | G 1782 | |
| 65 | Jezierski | Nowina | G 1801; R 1849; K.P. | |
| 66 | Jundziłł | Łabędź | P 1798 | |
| 67 | Kalinowski | Kalinowa | A 1818 | |
| 68 | Karnicki | Kościesza | A 1845 | |
| 69 | Karśnicki | Jastrzębiec | A 1821 | |
| 70 | Kaszowski | Janina | R 1902 | |
| 71 | Kęszycki | Nałęcz | S.A. 1875 | |
| 72 | Kiciński | Rogala | G 1806; K.P. 1810, R 1844 | |
| 73 | Koczorowski | Rogala | S.A. 1871 | the title expired |
| 74 | Komarnicki | Sas II | G 1803 | |
| 75 | Komorowski | Ciołek | A 1817 | |
| 76 | Komorowski | Korczak | G 1793, 1803, 1894; R 1844; K.P. | |
| 77 | Konarski | Gryf | G 1783 | |
| 78 | Konopacki | Trzaska | S 1875 | |
| 79 | Korytowski | Mora | A 1893 | |
| 80 | Korwin-Kossakowski | Ślepowron | A 1784; R 1804, 1843, 1859, 1861, 1875, 1888 | |
| 81 | Koziebrodzki | Jastrzębiec | G 1781 | |
| 82 | Krasicki | Rogala | S.I.R. 1631, A 1786, R 1844, 1852, 1866, 1882 | |
| 83 | Krasiński | Ślepowron | P 1798, 1806; F 1811; R 1837; A 1848, 1856, 1882; K.P. | |
| 84 | Kręski | Nadelwicz | P 1843 | |
| 85 | Krosnowski | Junosza | A 1791, 1841; K.P. | |
| 86 | Krukowiecki | Pomian | G 1784; R 1847; K.P. | |
| 87 | Kuczkowski | Jastrzębiec | G 1807 | |
| 88 | Kurnatowski | Łodzia | S.A. 1902 | |
| 89 | Kuropatnicki | Nieczuja | G 1779 | |
| 90 | Kwilecki | Szreniawa | 1816; K.P. | |
| 91 | Lanckoroński | Zadora | G (S.I.R.) 1782, 1783; K.P. | |
| 92 | Lasocki | Dołęga | S.A. 1869; A 1888, 1892. | |
| 93 | Laskiewicz | de Friedensfeld | G 1783 | |
| 94 | Latalski | Prawdzic | S.I.R. 1538, K.P. | |
| 95 | Ledóchowski | Szaława | A 1800; R 1845; K.P. | |
| 96 | Leszczyński | Abdank | G 1782 | |
| 97 | Lubieniecki | Rola | G 1783; R 1845; K.P. | |
| 98 | Mańkowski | Zaremba | S.A. 1887 | |
| 99 | Matuszewicz | Łabędź | K.P. | |
| 100 | Męciński | Męciński | G 1801; K.P. | died out |
| 101 | Miączyński | Suchekomnaty | S.A. 1803; P 1853; R 1875, 1876, 1881 | |
| 102 | Michałowski | Jasieńczyk | A 1868; G 1885 | |
| 103 | Mielżyński | Nowina | P 1786, 1817; K.P. | |
| 104 | Mier | Mier | A 1777 | |
| 105 | Mieroszewski | Ślepowron | P 1798; A 1869; K.P. | |
| 106 | Mikorski | Ostoja | P 1798; K.P. | |
| 107 | Milewski | Ślepowron | S.A. 1876 | |
| 108 | Młodecki | Półkozic | S.A. 1881 | |
| 109 | Mniszech | Mniszech | A 1783, 1848 | |
| 110 | Mniszek | Poraj | G 1783 | |
| 111 | Morski | Nałęcz | G 1784; K.P. | |
| 112 | Morsztyn | Leliwa | A 1915; K.P. | |
| 113 | Mostowski | Dołęga | R 1843, 1851, 1852; K.P. | |
| 114 | Moszczeński | Nałęcz | G 1788; P 1803; R 1856 | |
| 115 | Moszyński | Nałęcz | S 1730 | |
| 116 | Opacki | Prus III | P 1797 | |
| 117 | Orłowski | Lubicz | I 1879, 1886; Baw. 1903 | |
| 118 | Osiecimski-Hutten-Czapski | Lubicz | A 1907 | the family extinct |
| 119 | Ossoliński | Ossoliński | A 1785; P 1805; R 1848; K.P. | |
| 120 | Ostroróg | Nałęcz | G 1783; R 1844, 1903; K.P. | |
| 121 | Ostrowski | Rawicz | P 1798; R 1844, 1855, 1891, 1898; K.P. | |
| 122 | Otocki | Dołęga | G 1797 | |
| 123 | Ożarowski | Rawicz | R 1838; K.P. | |
| 124 | Pac | Gozdawa | K.P. | the title expired and family extinct |
| 125 | Parys | Prawdzic | G 1808, K.P. | |
| 126 | Pawłowski | Ślepowron | A 1810 | |
| 127 | Piniński | Jastrzębiec | G 1780 | |
| 128 | Piwnicki | Lubicz | P 1844 | |
| 129 | Broel-Plater von Broel | Broel-Plater | R 1803, 1829, 1843; B 1970 | |
| 130 | Poletyło | Trzywdar | G 1800; R 1844; K.P. | the title expired |
| 131 | Poniatowski | Ciołek | Rz.O 15th Century | |
| 132 | Poniński de Ponin | Łodzia | P 1782, 1840; A 1842, 1863; Baw. 1841; I 1880, 1888; S.A. 1908 | |
| 133 | Potocki | Piława | R 1838; 1843, 1859, 1890, 1903; G 1777, 1784; S.A. 1889; K.P. | |
| 134 | Potulicki | Grzymała | P 1780; R 1852; K.P. | |
| 135 | Potworowski | Dębno | P 1816 | |
| 136 | Pruszyński | Rawicz | S.A. 1883 | |
| 137 | Przerembski | Nowina | S.I.R. 1637; K.P. | |
| 138 | Przeździecki | Roch III | 1843, 1913 | the title expired |
| 139 | Pusłowski | Szeliga | S.A. 1869, 1871 | |
| 140 | Raczyński | Nałęcz | P 1798, 1824, 1905; A 1904 | |
| 141 | Werszowiec-Rey de Nagłowice | Oksza | G 1806 | |
| 142 | Rogaliński | Łodzia | S.I.R. 1787 | |
| 143 | Romer | Romer | A 1818 | |
| 144 | Roniker | Gryf | R 1850 | |
| 145 | Jordan-Rozwadowski | Trąby | G 1783; R 1872 | The titles expired with the Austro-Hungarian Empire. Last holder of record was Col. Jozef Jordan-Rozwadowski (Pol. Army, ret.), who died in 1984 in Las Vegas. The family is large, but is unclear who the present holder of this might be. |
| 146 | Russocki | Zadora | G 1800; S.I.R. 1803; K.P. | |
| 147 | Rzewuski | Krzywda | A 1819, 1858; R 1856, 1885 | the title expired |
| 148 | Rzyszczewski | Pobóg | A 1845; I 1884 | |
| 149 | Siekierzyński | Zadora | G 1783 | |
| 150 | Siemieński | Dąbrowa | G 1779; A 1781 | |
| 151 | Siemieński-Lewicki | Dąbrowa | G 1779; A 1781 | |
| 152 | Sierakówski | Ogończyk | G 1775; R 1844; K.P. | |
| 153 | Skarbek | Abdank | G 1778; A 1835; R 1835; K.P. | |
| 154 | Skarzyński | Bończa | S.A. 1884 | the title expired |
| 155 | Skorzewski | Drogosław | P 1787, 1840 | |
| 156 | Skrzyński | Zaremba | A 1895 | the title expired |
| 157 | Smorczewski | Rawicz | S.A. 1892 | |
| 158 | Sobański | Junosza | S.A. 1880 | |
| 159 | Sobolewski | Ślepowron | K.P. | |
| 160 | Sokolnicki | Nowina | P 1817 | |
| 161 | Stadnicki | Szreniawa bez Krzyża | G 1783, 1784, 1788; R 1809, 1840, 1841, 1862, 1888, 1894; K.P. | |
| 162 | Starzeński von Starzenice auf Strabla | Lis | G 1780; P 1799; R 1849; K.P. | |
| 163 | Suchodolski | Janina | G 1800; R 1847; K.P. | the title expired |
| 164 | Sułkowski | Sulima | S.I.R. 1733, | |
| 165 | Sumiński | Leszczyc | S 1870; P 1876 | |
| 166 | Szaniawski | Junosza | G 1800 | |
| 167 | Szeliski | Szeliga | S.A. 1894 | |
| 168 | Szembek | Szembek | P 1816; K.P. | |
| 169 | Szeptycki | Szeptycki | A 1871 | |
| 170 | Szlubowski | Ślepowron | S.A. 1869 | |
| 171 | Szołdrski | Łodzia | P 1798; K.P. | |
| 172 | Szydłowiecki | Odrowąż | | |
| 173 | Taczanowski | Jastrzębiec | P 1854 | |
| 185 | Tarło | Topór | K.P. | the title expired and family extinct |
| 174 | Tarnowski de Tarnów | Leliwa | S.I.R. 1547; G 1785, 1887; R 1861; K.P. | |
| 175 | Trembiński | Rogala | G 1783. | |
| 176 | Tyszkiewicz-Kalenicki auf Łohojsk und Berdyczów | Leliwa | Rz.O. 1569; R 1861, 1862, 1902; S 1871; A 1893 | |
| 177 | Uliński | Dołęga | S.I.R. 1779. | died out |
| 178 | Umiastowski | Roch III | S.A. 1882 | title expired |
| 178 | Uruski | Sas | A 1844; R 1853 | died out, |
| 180 | Walewski | Kolumna | R 1833; P 1872; F 1812; K.P. | title expired |
| 181 | Wąsowicz | Łabędź | K.P. | title expired |
| 182 | Węsierski | Belina | P 1853 | died out |
| 183 | Węsierski-Kwilecki | Belina | P 1854 | died out |
| 184 | Wielhorski | Kierdeja | R 1849; K.P. | died out |
| 185 | Wielopolski | Starykoń | S.I.R. 1656; G 1788; R 1879; K.P. | |
| 186 | Wiesiołowski | Ogończyk | G 1780 | died out. |
| 187 | Wiśniewski | Prus | A 1876 | died out |
| 188 | Wodzicki | Leliwa | G 1799; R 1842; K.P. | |
| 189 | Wolański | Przyjaciel | A 1886, 1888 | |
| 190 | Wolski | Rola | P 1798 | died out |
| 191 | Wołłowicz | Bogorya | P 1798; R 1844; K.P. | died out |
| 192 | Woyna | Trąby | G 1800 | died out |
| 193 | Zabielski | Trzaska | G 1808 | died out |
| 194 | Zabiełło | Trąby | A 1888; K.P. | |
| 195 | Zaleski | Dołęga | A 1913; P 1917, I 1932 | |
| 196 | Załuski | Junosza | A 1776; K.P. | |
| 197 | Zamoyski de Zamość | Jelita | G 1778; A 1820; R 1844; K.P. | |
| 198 | Zawadzki | Rogala | S.A. 1865 | title expired |
| 199 | Zboiński de Ossówka | Ogończyk | P 1798, K.P., R 1842 | died out |
| 200 | Zborowski von Zborów | Zborowski | G 1792 | |
| 201 | Zbyszewski | Topór | S.A. 1882 | title expired |
| 202 | Żeleński | Ciołek | A 1801, K.P 1803, Ang 1912; 1982-Present | Title is honored by the Polish Republic for the Żeleński Family Foundation's major contributions to educational and infrastructure sectors |
| 223 | Żółtowski | Ogończyk | P 1844, S.A. 1870 (?), 1877, 1893, 1900, 1901, 1917 | |
| 224 | Żyniew | Pawęża | K.P. | title expired |

== Abbreviations explanation ==
Abbreviations
A – Habsburg monarchy / Austrian Empire / Kingdom of Hungary
Ang. – England
B – Belgium
Baw. – Bavaria
F – France
G – Kingdom of Galicia and Lodomeria
I – Italy
K.P. – Kingdom of Poland (1815–1918)
P – Prussia
Rz.O. – Polish–Lithuanian Commonwealth
R – Russia

RP – Republic of Poland (Contemporary Poland)
S – Saxony
S.A. – Papal State
S.I.R. – Holy Roman Empire

== See also ==
- List of szlachta
- List of Polish titled nobility
- Magnates of Poland and Lithuania

== Bibliography ==
- Karl Friedrich von Frank, Standeserhebungen und Gnadenakte für das Deutsche Reich und die Österreichischen Erblande ..., Bd. 1-5. Schloss Senftenegg 1972.
- Peter Frank zu Döfering, Adelslexikon des Österreichischen Kaisertums 1804-1918. Verzeichnis der Gnadenakte, Standeserhebungen, Adelsanerkennungen und -bestätigungen im Österreichischen Staatsarchiv in Wien, Wien 1989.
- Der Adel von Galizien, Lodomerien und der Bukowina. J. Siebmacher's großes Wappenbuch, Band 32, Nürnberg 1905, s. 67-99.
- Szymon Konarski, Armorial de la noblesse titrèe polonaise, Paris 1958, s. 131-361.
- Tomasz Lenczewski, Genealogie rodów utytułowanych w Polsce, t. I, Warszawa 1997.
- Spiski licam titułowannym rossijskoj imperii, St. Petersburg 1892.
- SZLACHTA POLSKO-INFLANCKA WOBEC PRZEŁOMU. Dybaś Bogusław, Jeziorski Paweł A. SCIENCE IN TORUNIU PUBLISHING.
- Świat polskiej szlachty. Dzieje ludzi i rodzin. Rosołowski Marcin, Bińczyk Arkadiusz. Fundacja im. XBW Ignacego Krasickiego. 2019.
