= Roszkowski family =

Roszkowski
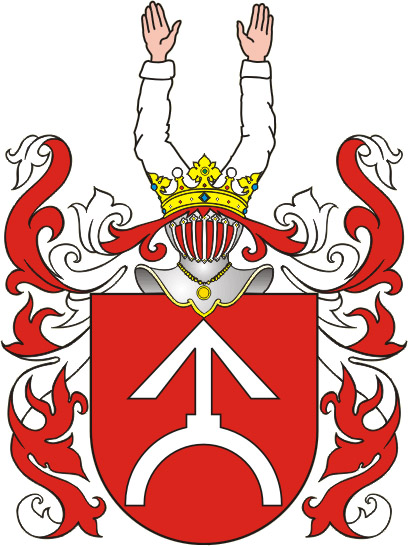
- Ogończyk – coat of arms of Roszkowski family
- Country: Poland
- Current region: Podlachia and Masovia
- Origin: Roszkowo
- Founded: 1390
- Founder: Zawisza z Roszkowa
- Titles: Her/His Excellency
- Members: Ireneusz Roszkowski; Stanley Julian Roszkowski; Wojciech Roszkowski; Eliza Roszkowska
- Motto: Semper fidelis (Always faithful)
- Estates: Roszkowski Palace in Tybory-Kamianka; Zamajdan Olszyny Park

The Roszkowski family (plural: Roszkowscy) is a Polish noble (szlachta) family. Since Polish adjectives have different forms for the genders, Roszkowska is the form for a female family member. The family has Ogończyk coat of arms.

== Etymology of the surname ==
The name of the Roszkowski family comes from the name of the village of Roszkowo (today Ruszki, Kuyavian-Pomeranian Voivodeship)

== History ==
The first mentions about the Roszkowski family are dated to 14th century, when the legendary knight Zawisza from the village of Roszkowo, who was a knight in the army of the King of Poland Władysław II Jagiełło, in the daring action rescued the knight of the Teutonic Order, who was drowning in the Neman river. This action had place in 1390.

In 1613 by the decision of the King of Poland Sigismund III Vasa and with an agreement of the Parliament of the Polish–Lithuanian Commonwealth the Roszkowski family was nobilitated by an act of an invesiture. By this decision the family also received Ogończyk coat of arms.

Mentioned before village Roszkowo is the first place to be reported to the family. Based on the chronicles it is known that in 16th century the part of the family settled in the Podlachia, and the rest of the family moved to Lesser Poland. However Podlachia became very connected to the family. The Roszkowski family after settling in this region founded dozen of villages named "Roszki" which together created the "noble area". The remains of this villages are today's villages: Roszki-Chrzczony, Roszki-Leśne, Roszki-Sączki, Roszki-Włodki, Roszki-Wodźki and Roszki-Ziemaki.

In 19th century the College of Arms which was an authority responsible to verify the noble statuses of the families unambiguously proclaimed that the Roszkowski family consists to the polish nobility (szlachta).

== Notable family members ==
- Piotr Roszkowski – cavalry captain in the army of the King Stephen Báthory
- Stanisław Roszkowski (1690-?) – secretary of the Kings Sigismund III Vasa and Władysław IV Vasa
- Eliza Roszkowska Öberg (born 1978), politician
- Ireneusz Roszkowski (1910–1996), obstetrician and gynaecologist
- Małgorzata Roszkowska (born 1967), judoka
- Stanley Julian Roszkowski (1923–2014), judge
- Wojciech Roszkowski (born 1947), historian

== Current properties ==
- Zamajdan Olszyny Park

== See also ==
- All pages with titles containing Roszkowski
- All pages with titles containing Roszkowska

== Bibliography ==
- Kasper Niesiecki, Herbarz Polski tom VIII, wyd. J.N. Bobrowicz, Lipsk 1839–1845, pp. 149
- Hipolit Stupnicki, Herbarz polski i imionospis zasłużonych w Polsce ludzi wszystkich stanów i czasów; ułożony porządkiem alfabetycznym na podstawie Herbarza Niesieckiego i manuskryptów. Tom III, wyd. K. Piller, Lwów 1862, pp. 24
- Adam Boniecki: Herbarz Polski. Cz. 1. T. 2. Warszawa, 190
