= Roszkowski =

Roszkowski (feminine: Roszkowska; plural: Roszkowscy) is a Polish noble surname. It may refer to:

== People ==
- Eliza Roszkowska Öberg (born 1978), Swedish politician
- Ireneusz Roszkowski (1910–1996), Polish obstetrician and gynaecologist
- Małgorzata Roszkowska (born 1967), Polish judoka
- Stanley Julian Roszkowski (1923–2014), American judge
- Wojciech Roszkowski (born 1947), Polish historian
- Patricia J Roszkowski (born 1984) American Artist

== See also ==
- Roszkowski family
