= Andrzej Węgierski =

Polish historian

- Coat of arms: Belina
- Born: 16 November 1600; Ostroróg, Kingdom of Poland
- Died: 11 January 1649 (aged 48); Orzeszkowo, Kingdom of Poland
- Noble family: Węgierski
- Father: Wacław Węgierski

Andrzej Węgierski (born 16 November 1600 in Ostroróg; died 11 January 1649 in Orzeszkowo) was a Polish Calvinist historian, preacher, poet and translator.

Belina coat of arms

He came from the Węgierski noble family of Belina coat of arms, descending from the village of Węgierki in Greater Poland. He attended schools in Ostroróg, Leszno and Bytom Odrzański. From 1633 to 1648 he was the minister of the Calvinist congregation in Włodawa.

His main work was the Slavonia reformata, continentes historiam ecclesiasticam (1st Ed Germany 1652, 2nd Ed. Amsterdam 1679, modern edition Warsaw 1973) In this he gives the history of both the Calvinist ecclesia major and Antitrinitarian (Arian or Socinian) ecclesia minor of the Polish Brethren.
