= Thomas M. Durkin =

American judge (born 1953)

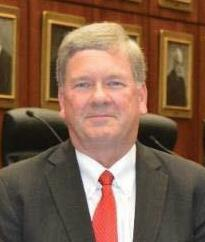
- Durkin in 2019

Senior Judge of the United States District Court for the Northern District of Illinois
- Incumbent
- Assumed office December 26, 2023

Judge of the United States District Court for the Northern District of Illinois
- In office December 19, 2012 – December 26, 2023
- Appointed by: Barack Obama
- Preceded by: Wayne Andersen
- Succeeded by: Sunil Harjani

Personal details
- Born: Thomas Michael Durkin; 1953 (age 72–73) Chicago, Illinois, U.S.
- Party: Republican
- Relations: Jim Durkin (brother)
- Education: University of Illinois (BS); DePaul University (JD)

Thomas Michael Durkin (born 1953) is a senior United States district judge of the United States District Court for the Northern District of Illinois.

== Biography ==
Durkin was born in Chicago. He received his Bachelor of Science degree, cum laude, from the University of Illinois Urbana-Champaign in 1975. He received his Juris Doctor degree, cum laude, from the DePaul University College of Law in 1978. From 1978 to 1980, he served as a law clerk to Judge Stanley Julian Roszkowski of the United States District Court for the Northern District of Illinois. From 1980 to 1993, he served as an assistant United States attorney in the Northern District of Illinois. His leadership positions during that service included chief of the special prosecutions division, chief of the criminal receiving and appellate division and first assistant United States attorney. From 1993 to 2012, he served as a partner at Mayer Brown LLP in Chicago, where he handled a wide variety of matters including complex commercial litigation and white collar criminal defense.

=== Federal judicial service ===
On May 21, 2012, President Barack Obama nominated Durkin to be a United States district judge of the United States District Court for the Northern District of Illinois, to the seat vacated by Judge Wayne Andersen who retired in 2010. The Senate confirmed Durkin in a voice vote on December 17, 2012. He received his commission on December 19, 2012. Durkin assumed senior status on December 26, 2023.

==== Dennis Hastert case ====
In 2015, Durkin heard allegations against former Speaker of the House Dennis Hastert, who was charged with alleged violations of banking laws, reportedly to pay off a victim of sexual abuse. Durkin declared several potential conflicts of interest, including a past donation to Hastert's congressional campaign and past interactions with prosecutors in the case; ultimately, the attorneys did not seek his recusal. Ultimately, Durkin sentenced Hastert to 15 months in prison, far more than the federal recommended sentencing guidelines of zero to six months of prison. The maximum possible sentence was five years. Durkin also described Hastert as a "serial child molester".

== Personal ==
Durkin's brother, Jim Durkin, served as a Republican member of the Illinois House of Representatives from 1995 to 2003 and again from 2006 to 2023 including a stint as the minority leader from 2013 to 2023.

Legal offices
Preceded by Wayne Andersen	Judge of the United States District Court for the Northern District of Illinois; 2012–2023	Succeeded by Sunil Harjani
