= Budiatychi =

Budiatychi Будятичі
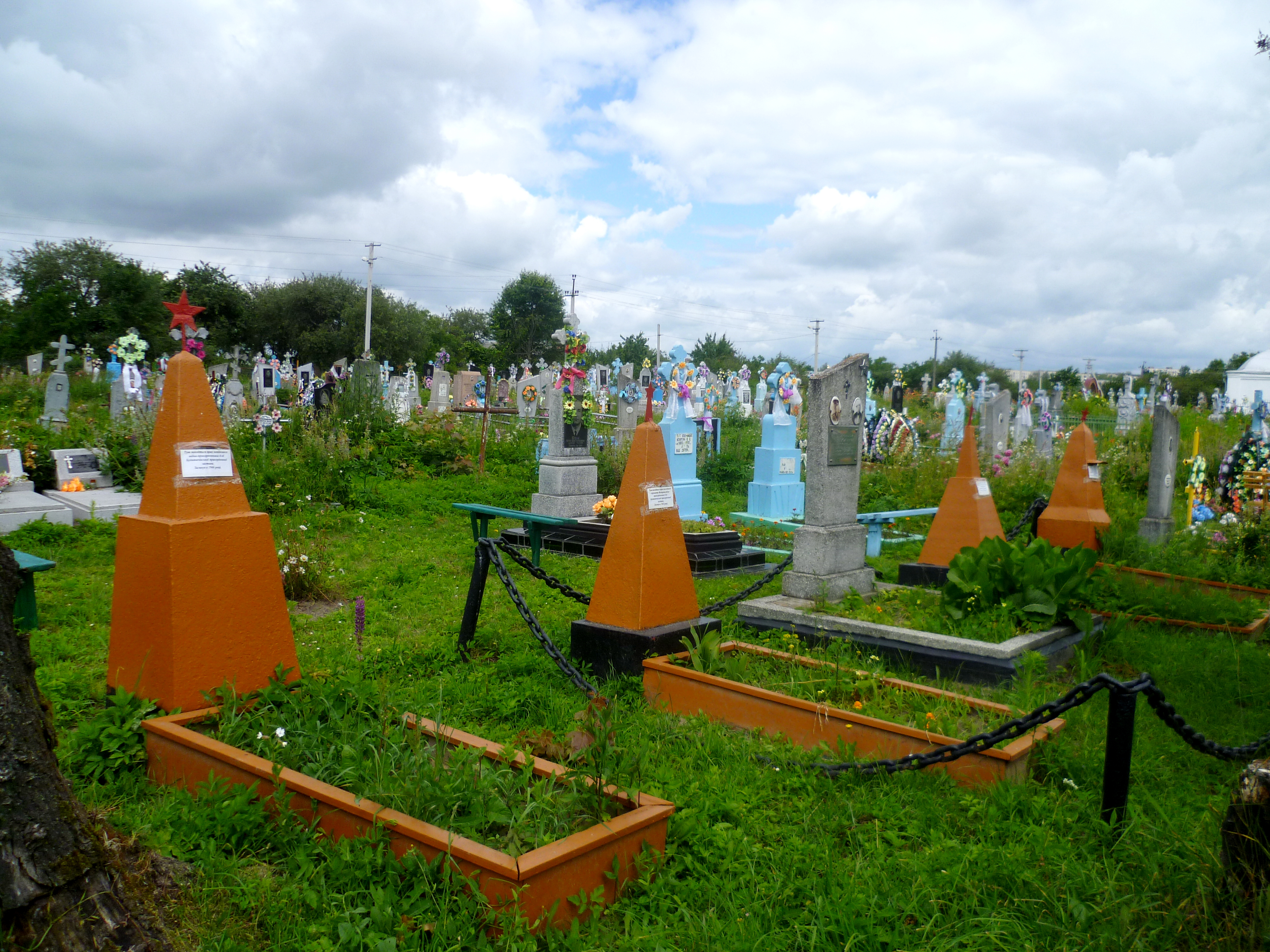
- Local cemetery
- Interactive map of Budiatychi
- Location within Volyn Oblast Location within Ukraine
- Coordinates: 50°42′27″N 24°10′30″E
- Country: Ukraine
- Oblast: Volyn Oblast
- Raion: Volodymyr Raion

Area
  - Total: 5.00 km^{2} (1.93 sq mi)

Population (2022)
  - Total: 636
  - Density: 1,272/km^{2} (3,290/sq mi)
- Time zone: UTC+2 (EET)
  - Summer (DST): UTC+3 (EEST)
- Postal code: 45313
- Area code: +380 3372

Budiatychi (Ukrainian: Будятичі) is a village in the Volodymyr Raion (district) of the Volyn Oblast (province) in western Ukraine near Novovolynsk and the border with Poland.

== History ==
Budiatychi is a possible birthplace of Volodymyr the Great, Grand Prince of Kiev, ruler of Rus'.

Budiatyce, as it was known in Polish, was a private village of various nobility, including the Steckiewicz, Maluszycki, Czartoryski and Czacki families, administratively located in the Volhynian Voivodeship in the Lesser Poland Province of the Kingdom of Poland. Following the Third Partition of Poland in 1795, the village was annexed by Russia, and following World War I, it became part of newly reestablished Poland.

Following the German-Soviet invasion of Poland, which started World War II in September 1939, it was first occupied by the Soviet Union until 1941, then by Nazi Germany until 1944, and then re-occupied by the Soviet Union, which eventually annexed it from Poland in 1945.

== Sources ==
- (in Ukrainian)
- (in Polish) "Budiatycze". Geographical Dictionary of the Kingdom of Poland (in Polish). p. 259.

. — P. 259.
