= Richard McLaren =

Richard McLaren may refer to:

- Richard Wellington McLaren (1918–1976), United States federal judge
- Richard Lance McLaren, see Republic of Texas (group)
- Richard McLaren (academic) (born 1945), Canadian academic and sports lawyer
