= Kaczorowski =

Kaczorowski (feminine: Kaczorowska, plural: Kaczorowscy) is a Polish surname. Notable people with this surname include:

- Aleksander Kaczorowski (born 1969), Polish bohemist, journalist, editor, writer and translator
- Daniel Kaczorowski (born 1952), French former rugby union player
- Fr Henryk Kaczorowski (1888–1942), one of the 108 Martyrs of World War Two
- Karolina Kaczorowska (1930–2021), widow of Ryszard Kaczorowski
- Klaudia Kaczorowska (born 1988), Polish female volleyball player
- Maciej Kaczorowski (born 1980), Polish footballer
- Mick Kaczorowski (born 1960), American producer and executive producer
- Nina Kaczorowski (born 1975), American actress and stuntwoman
- Paweł Kaczorowski (born 1949, Polish cyclist
- Paweł Kaczorowski (born 1974), Polish footballer
- Peter Kaczorowski (born 1956), American stage lighting designer
- Ryszard Kaczorowski (1919–2010), last Polish President in Exile

== See also ==
- Kaczor
