= Christian Köhler =

German painter (1809-1861)

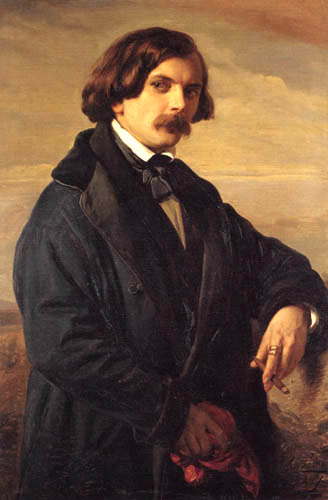
- Christian Köhler; portrait by Karl Ferdinand Sohn
- Born: October 13, 1809; Werben, Kingdom of Prussia
- Died: January 30, 1861 (aged 51); Montpellier, France
- Education: Kunstakademie Düsseldorf
- Known for: Painting
- Style: Nazarene movement influences, Düsseldorfer Malerschule
- Movement: Düsseldorfer Malerschule

Christian Köhler (13 October 1809 in Werben – 30 January 1861 in Montpellier) was a German painter, associated with the Düsseldorfer Malerschule, although his style owes much to the Nazarene movement.

== Life and work ==
While working as a groom for the writer, Heinrich Clauren, he became acquainted with the painter, Friedrich Wilhelm von Schadow. When Schadow moved from Berlin to Düsseldorf, he followed and became one of his private students. In 1827, he enrolled at the Kunstakademie Düsseldorf, where he progressed to the master classes by 1837. That same year, he participated in the exhibition at the Palais Brühl that established the "Düsseldorfer Schule".

In 1851, he took part in a major exhibition at the Salon des Bruxelles. From 1852, he was a Professor and assistant to Theodor Hildebrandt at the Kunstakademie; succeeding him as head of the Antikensaals (antiquities collection) in 1855, when Hildebrandt became too ill to work. During the school year of 1859/60, he became ill himself and went to Southern France, seeking a cure. He died there the following year.

He was a member of the progressive artists' association, Malkasten. His well known students include Heinrich von Angeli, Carl Hertel, Olaf Isaachsen, Vincent Stoltenberg Lerche, Zdzisław Suchodolski and Fredrik Wohlfahrt. Many of his works were reproduced as engravings or lithographs.
