= Wayne Andersen =

American judge (born 1945)

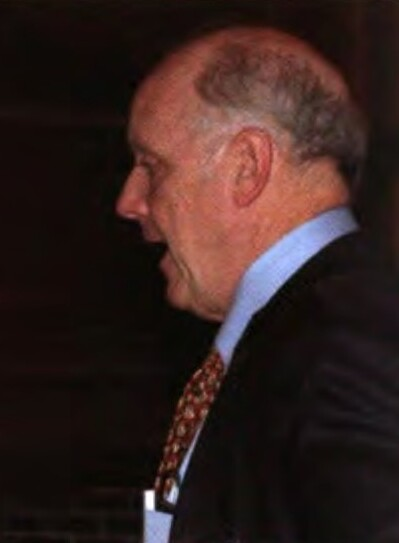

Judge of the United States District Court for the Northern District of Illinois
- In office November 18, 1991 – July 31, 2010
- Appointed by: George H. W. Bush
- Preceded by: Stanley Julian Roszkowski
- Succeeded by: Thomas M. Durkin

Personal details
- Born: Wayne Robert Andersen; July 30, 1945 (age 80) Chicago, Illinois, U.S.
- Education: Harvard University (BA); University of Illinois College of Law (JD)

Wayne Robert Andersen (born July 30, 1945) is a former United States district judge of the United States District Court for the Northern District of Illinois.

== Education and career ==
Born in Chicago, Illinois, Andersen received a Bachelor of Arts degree from Harvard University in 1967 and a Juris Doctor from the University of Illinois College of Law in 1970. Andersen was captain of the track team at Harvard and co-holds the team record in the 100-yard dash. He was an administrative assistant to Majority Leader Henry Hyde in the Illinois House of Representatives from 1970 to 1972. Andersen then entered private practice in Chicago until 1980. He was a deputy secretary of state of Illinois, Office of Secretary of State Jim Edgar from 1981 to 1984. He was a judge on the Circuit Court of Cook County, Illinois from 1984 to 1991, and a Supervising Judge, Chicago Traffic Court, Chicago, Illinois from 1989 to 1991.

== Federal judicial service ==
On July 24, 1991, Andersen was nominated by President George H. W. Bush to a seat on the United States District Court for the Northern District of Illinois vacated by Stanley Julian Roszkowski. Andersen was confirmed by the United States Senate on November 15, 1991, and received his commission on November 18, 1991. He retired on July 31, 2010.

Legal offices
| Preceded by Stanley Julian Roszkowski | Judge of the United States District Court for the Northern District of Illinois; 1991–2010 | Succeeded by Thomas M. Durkin |
