= 1945–1979: History and the Present =

School textbook by Wojciech Roszkowski

- Author: Wojciech Roszkowski
- Language: Polish
- Publisher: Biały Kruk
- Publication date: 2022
- Publication place: Poland
- Media type: textbook

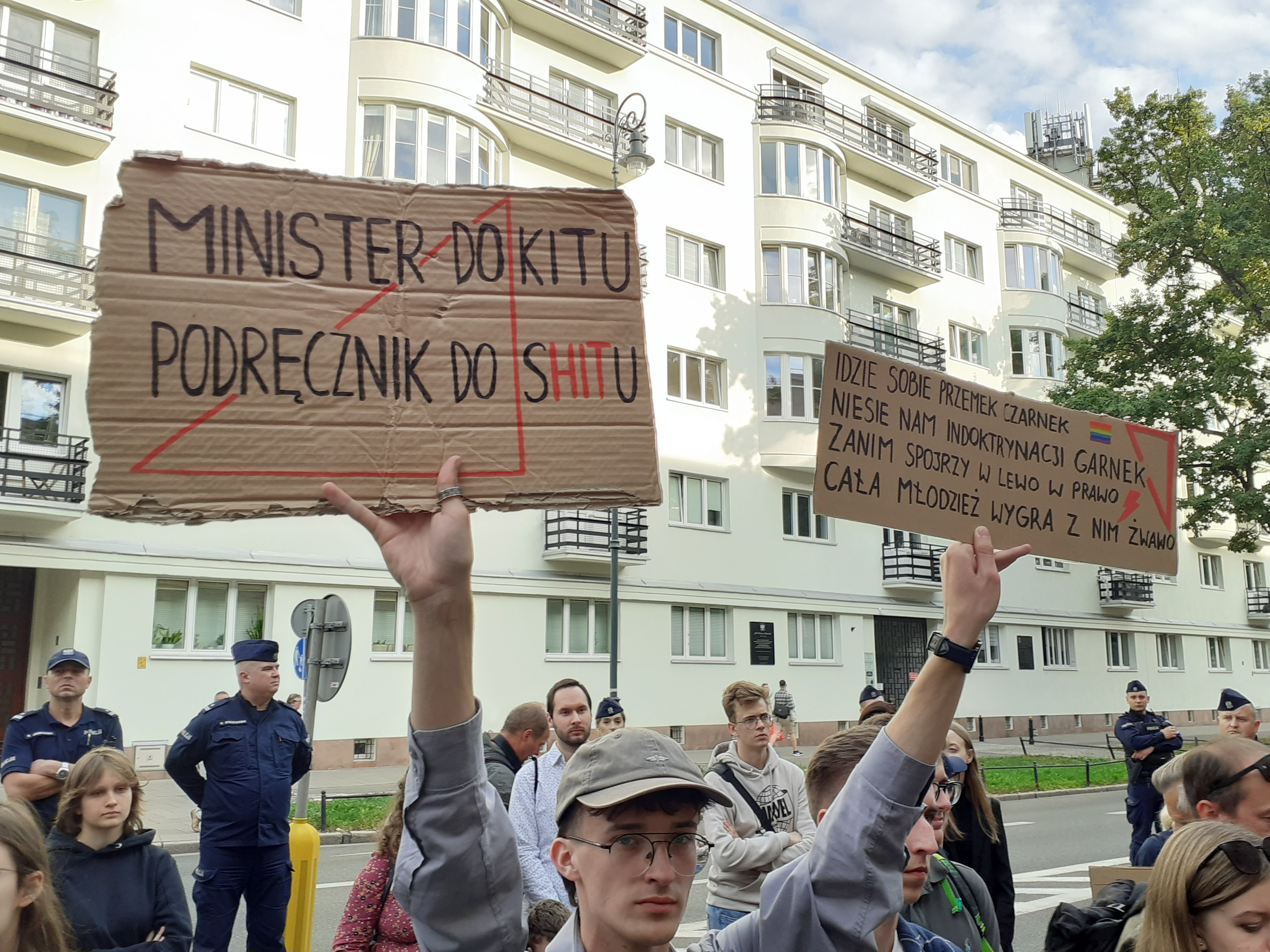
Demonstration in front of the Ministry of Education and Science against the inclusion of the textbook in the curriculum (2022)

1945–1979. Historia i teraźniejszość (1945–1979. History and the Present) is a school textbook written by Wojciech Roszkowski for the subject of History and the Present, published in 2022 in Kraków by the Biały Kruk publishing house. The textbook was officially approved for general education use in high schools and technical schools on 1 July 2022 as the first textbook for this subject.

From the time of its release, the textbook sparked controversy, facing accusations of stigmatizing children born via in vitro fertilization, equating feminism with Nazism, and adopting an essayistic, persuasive tone. During the review process, Grzegorz Ptaszek issued a negative linguistic opinion; however, after receiving a positive opinion from Klemens Stróżyński, the textbook was approved for school use despite concerns raised by experts. There were claims that the Ministry of Education and Science promoted this textbook over a competing one from Wydawnictwa Szkolne i Pedagogiczne, reflected in the speed of the review process for both books. (Note: Ultimately, the WSiP textbook was approved for school use on 2 September 2022.)

The textbook has been described as critical of Western popular culture and the West's shift away from Christianity, aligning with Roszkowski's broader body of work, including books such as Świat Chrystusa (The World of Christ) and Roztrzaskane lustro. Upadek cywilizacji zachodniej (Shattered Mirror: The Fall of Western Civilization). Significant portions of Roztrzaskane lustro were reprinted in the textbook, leading to accusations of self-plagiarism.

The Minister of Education and Science, Przemysław Czarnek, praised the textbook, stating that it presents the truth about Poland’s recent history, which had previously been distorted. He argued that critics either only knew the falsified version of history (created by their grandparents, security officers, and communists) or were actively promoting anti-Polish shameful pedagogy.

Due to the public controversy, which some characterized as substantial in terms of social protests, the Commissioner for Human Rights, Marcin Wiącek, requested the Minister of Education and Science in mid-August 2022 to clarify whether the content of the textbook had been analyzed from the perspective of the constitutional principle of the state's ideological neutrality.

At the start of the 2022/23 school year, the textbook was not widely adopted in schools. The Wolna Szkoła organization reported that only 53 schools out of over 2,300 examined had chosen to use it. In an interview, Roszkowski acknowledged that even fewer schools were using his textbook but emphasized its popularity in the open market. The textbook sold approximately 25,000 copies.

In 2023, a second part of this textbook for grade 2 was published, titled 1980–2015 Historia i teraźniejszość.
