= Sunil Harjani =

American judge (born 1974)

Sunil R. Harjani
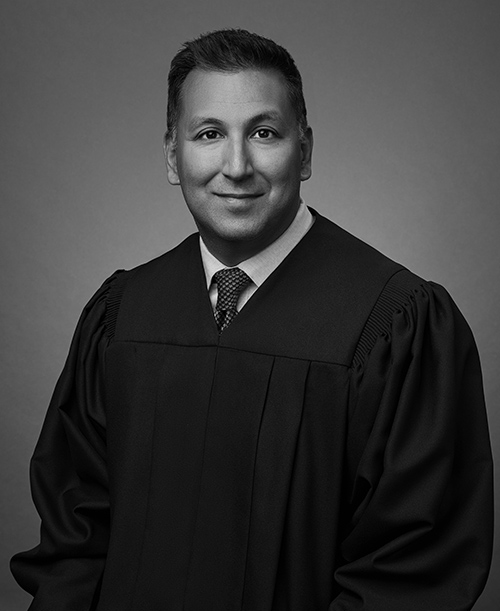

Judge of the United States District Court for the Northern District of Illinois
- Incumbent
- Assumed office March 20, 2024
- Appointed by: Joe Biden
- Preceded by: Thomas M. Durkin

Magistrate Judge of the United States District Court for the Northern District of Illinois
- In office January 10, 2019 – March 20, 2024
- Preceded by: Daniel G. Martin
- Succeeded by: Daniel P. McLaughlin

Personal details
- Born: Sunil Ramesh Harjani; 1974 (age 51–52) Joliet, Illinois, U.S.
- Education: Northwestern University (BA, JD)

Sunil Harjani (born 1974) is an American lawyer who has served since 2024 as a United States district judge of the United States District Court for the Northern District of Illinois. From 2019 to 2024, he served as a magistrate judge of the same court.

== Education ==
Harjani received a Bachelor of Arts from Northwestern University in 1997 and a Juris Doctor, cum laude, from Northwestern University Pritzker School of Law in 2000.

== Career ==
From 2000 to 2001, Harjani was an associate at Jenner & Block LLP in Chicago. From 2001 to 2002, he served as a law clerk for Judge Suzanne B. Conlon of the United States District Court for the Northern District of Illinois. From 2002 to 2004, he resumed his position at Jenner & Block. From 2004 to 2008, he also practiced federal civil litigation as a senior counsel at the United States Securities and Exchange Commission. From 2008 to 2019, Harjani was an assistant U.S. attorney, serving as the deputy chief of the securities and commodities fraud section. From 2019 to 2024, he served as a United States magistrate judge of the Northern District of Illinois.

=== Federal judicial service ===
On January 10, 2024, President Joe Biden announced his intent to nominate Harjani to serve as a United States district judge of the United States District Court for the Northern District of Illinois. On February 1, Biden nominated Harjani to a seat vacated by Judge Thomas M. Durkin, who assumed senior status on December 26, 2023. On February 8, 2024, a hearing on his nomination was held before the Senate Judiciary Committee. On March 7, his nomination was favorably reported out of committee by a 12–9 vote. On March 12, the United States Senate invoked cloture on his nomination by a 52–44 vote. Later that day, his nomination was confirmed by a 53–46 vote. Harjani received his judicial commission on March 20 and was sworn in on April 2, 2024.

== See also ==
- List of Asian American jurists

Legal offices
Preceded by Thomas M. Durkin	Judge of the United States District Court for the Northern District of Illinois; 2024–present	Incumbent
