= Suchodolski =

Suchodolski (feminine: Suchodolska; plural: Suchodolscy) is a surname. Notable people with the surname include:

- January Suchodolski (1797–1875), Polish painter and Army officer
- Bogdan Suchodolski (1903–1992), Polish philosopher and historian
- Rajnold Suchodolski (1804–1831), Polish poet
- Wojciech Major Suchodolski (1974–2023), Polish vloger, collaborating with Krzysztof Kononowicz
- Zdzisław Suchodolski (1835–1908), Polish painter
