= Marceli Żółtowski =

Polish count and politician (1812–1901)

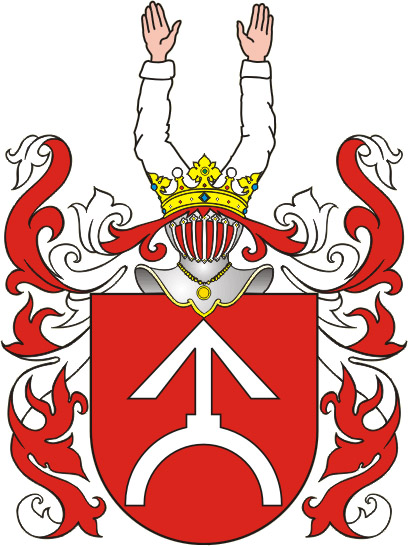
Coat of arms of Ogończyk

Marceli Żółtowski (14 March 1812 in Białcz, Kreis Kosten – 29 April 1901 in Poznań) was a Polish count and politician. A member of the Prussian House of Representatives, he had been a count since 1867 and held positions such as landlord of Greater Poland, general director of Towarzystwo Kredytowe Ziemskie of Grand Duchy of Posen (1850–1869) and was finally a member of the Prussian House of Lords from 1880 to his death in 1901.
