= Restore Me =

Studio album by Laura Kaczor
- Released: July 10, 2015
- Genres: Worship, CCM
- Length: 33:48
- Label: LifeThirst
- Producer: Ian Eskelin

Laura Kaczor chronology
Love Enough (2010)	Restore Me (2015)

Restore Me is the fourth studio album by Laura Kaczor released on July 10, 2015 through LifeThirst Music Records. Kaczor worked with Ian Eskelin for the production.

== Critical reception ==
Professional ratings
Review scores
Source	Rating
CCM Magazine	3.5/5 stars
Christian Music Review	3.5/5 stars
Cross Rhythms	6/10 squares
Journal of Gospel Music	4/5 stars
New Release Today	3/5 stars

Awarding the album three and a half stars for CCM Magazine, Kevin Sparkman writes, Restore Me "offers a collection of songs built on the foundations of hope, faith, and strength found in Jesus." Amanda Brogan-DeWilde, giving the album three stars at New Release Today, states, "Restore Me is an album that brings rest to a weary heart and calms a tired soul." Rating the album four stars from The Journal of Gospel Music, Bob Marovich describes, "Restore Me delivers praise, prayer, and gentle reassurance in bite-size chunks of ear candy." Laura Chambers, indicating in a three and a half star review by Christian Music Review, says, "Restore Me weaves the themes of trust and surrender throughout, producing an honest and devoted voice that single-mindedly points us towards greater things." Reviewing the album for Soul-Audio, Andrew Greenhalgh replies, "Restore Me, doesn’t break stride with her path, as she continues to offer up a solid vocal delivery around radio friendly adult contemporary arrangements." Andrew Wallace, rating the album a six out of ten at Cross Rhythms, recognizes, "Perhaps next time out it would be an idea to take more risks both musically and vocally."

== Track listing ==
No.	Title	Length
1.	"Forever"	3:09
2.	"You Know"	3:04
3.	"Once and For All"	3:51
4.	"If the Path Was Straight"	2:52
5.	"Restore Me"	3:09
6.	"Only You"	3:47
7.	"Rain Down"	3:19
8.	"You Make Me Brave"	3:30
9.	"We Don't Always Understand"	3:52
10.	"Greater"	3:15
Total length:		33:48
