= Joanna Grudzińska =

Polish noble

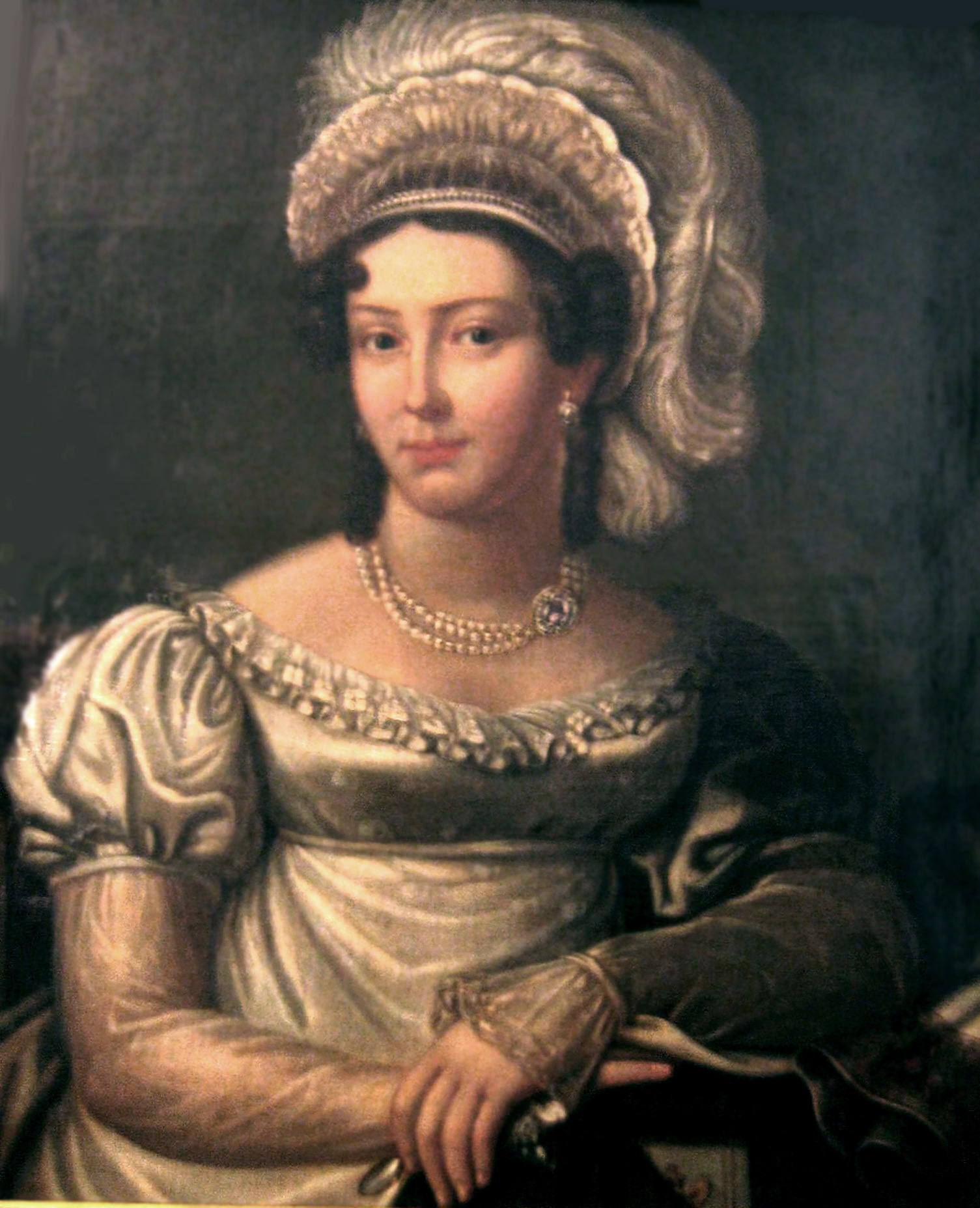
Joanna Grudzińska

Joanna Grudzińska (17 May 1791, Poznań – 17 November 1831, Tsarskoye Selo) was a Polish noble, a Princess of Łowicz and the second wife of Grand Duke Constantine Pavlovich of Russia, the de facto viceroy of the Kingdom of Poland. This marriage cost Konstantin the crown of Russia.

== Biography ==
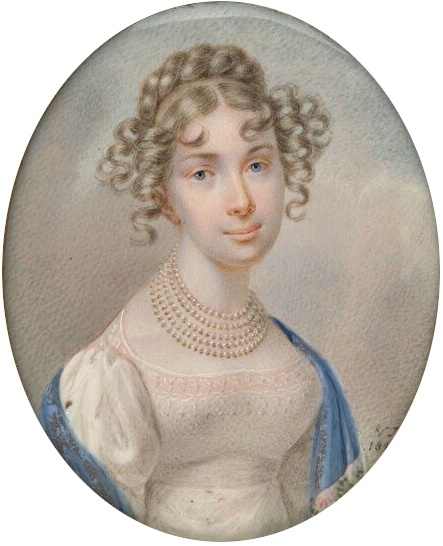
Portrait of Joanana in her youth by Waleria Tarnowska

Joanna was the eldest of three daughters of Count Antoni Grudziński, (1766–1835), the last owner of the town of Chodzież and his wife Marianna Dorpowska (1757–1810). Grudzińska was known for her beauty. From 1815, she had a relationship with Grand Duke Constantine of Russia whom she married as his second wife on 27 May 1820. Constantine was previously married to Princess Juliane of Saxe-Coburg-Saalfeld, who left him in 1801. In order to give approval for his marriage to Joanna, Constantine's brother Tsar Alexander I required him to forfeit his rights to the throne of Russia in favor of their younger brother Nicholas I. The secrecy of this decision, known only to a very close circle in Saint Petersburg, contributed to the Decembrist revolt of 1825 that followed Alexander's death.

After the marriage on 8 July 1820, Alexander styled Joanna Princess of Lovich. A Russian Imperial Navy frigate named in her honour (Knyaginya Lovich, Княгиня Лович) was launched in 1828 and served in the Mediterranean fleet during the Greek War of Independence and the Russo-Turkish War (1828–1829).

By some considered a traitor, Joanna remained faithful to her husband even after the November Uprising in which he fought against his Polish subjects. Her sister Maria Antonina was married to Gen. Dezydery Chłapowski, one of the most notable Polish commanders during the Uprising; another sister Teresa married Count Wiktor Felix Szoldrski (1817–1885), who served as an officer of Russian tsar's retinue.

Constantine died of cholera in Vitebsk in June 1831, shortly before their planned evacuation to Saint Petersburg. Joanna delivered his body to Saint Petersburg, and died the same year. She was buried in Tsarskoye Selo; in 1929 her remains were exhumed and reburied in the grave of her sister and Gen. Chłapowski in Rąbin near Leszno.

Her life was fictionalized in the Polish film Duchess of Łowicz (Polish: Księżna Łowicka).
