= Zoltowski =

Zoltowski or Żółtowski is a surname. Notable people with the surname include:

- Frank B. Zoltowski (born 1957), Australian astronomer
- Maciej Żółtowski (born 1971), Polish conductor and composer
- Marceli Żółtowski (1812–1901), Polish count and politician

== See also ==
- 18292 Zoltowski, a minor planet
