= Kiciński =

Kiciński (feminine: Kicińska, plural: Kicińscy) is a surname of Polish origin. It may refer to:

- Carol Kicinski, American food writer
- Michał Kiciński, Polish video game executive
