= Kachur =

Kachur (Ukrainian: Качур) is a Ukrainian surname meaning "drake" (male duck). Alternative transliterations include Kaczur, Kačur, Katchur, Katchour and Katschur. It is a cognate of the Polish surname Kaczor.

== People ==
=== Kachur ===
- Eddie Kachur (1934–2014), Canadian professional ice hockey player
- Havrylo Kachur (born 1954), Soviet/Ukrainian football defender and coach
- Pavlo Kachur (born 1953), Ukrainian politician
- Ruslan Kachur (born 1982), Ukrainian footballer
- Yana Kachur (born 1997), Ukrainian sprinter

=== Other forms ===
- Gale Katchur, Canadian politician
- Nicholas Kaczur (born 1979), Canadian football player
