= Kaczor =

Kaczor (Polish pronunciation: [ˈkat͡ʂɔr]) is a Polish-language surname meaning "drake" (male duck). It may appear as Kačor, Kachor, Katschor, or Katchor in other languages. It is a cognate of the Ukrainian surname Kachur. In Poland, Kaczor is particularly common in south-eastern and central-eastern areas.

== People ==
- Joanna Kaczor (born 1984), Polish volleyball player
- Josef Kaczor (born 1953), German footballer
- Kazimierz Kaczor (born 1941), Polish actor and television presenter
- Kazimierz Kaczor (footballer) (1895–1972), Polish footballer
- Laura Kaczor (born 1982), American musician
- Nate Kaczor (born 1967), American football coordinator
- Rafał Kaczor (born 1982), Polish amateur boxer
- Richie Kaczor (1952–1993), American musician
- Stanisław Kaczor-Batowski (1866–1946), Polish painter
- Ben Katchor (born 1951), American cartoonist

== See also ==
- Jarosław Kaczyński (born 1949), Polish politician frequently nicknamed "Kaczor"
