= Carl Hertel =

German genre painter (1837–1895)

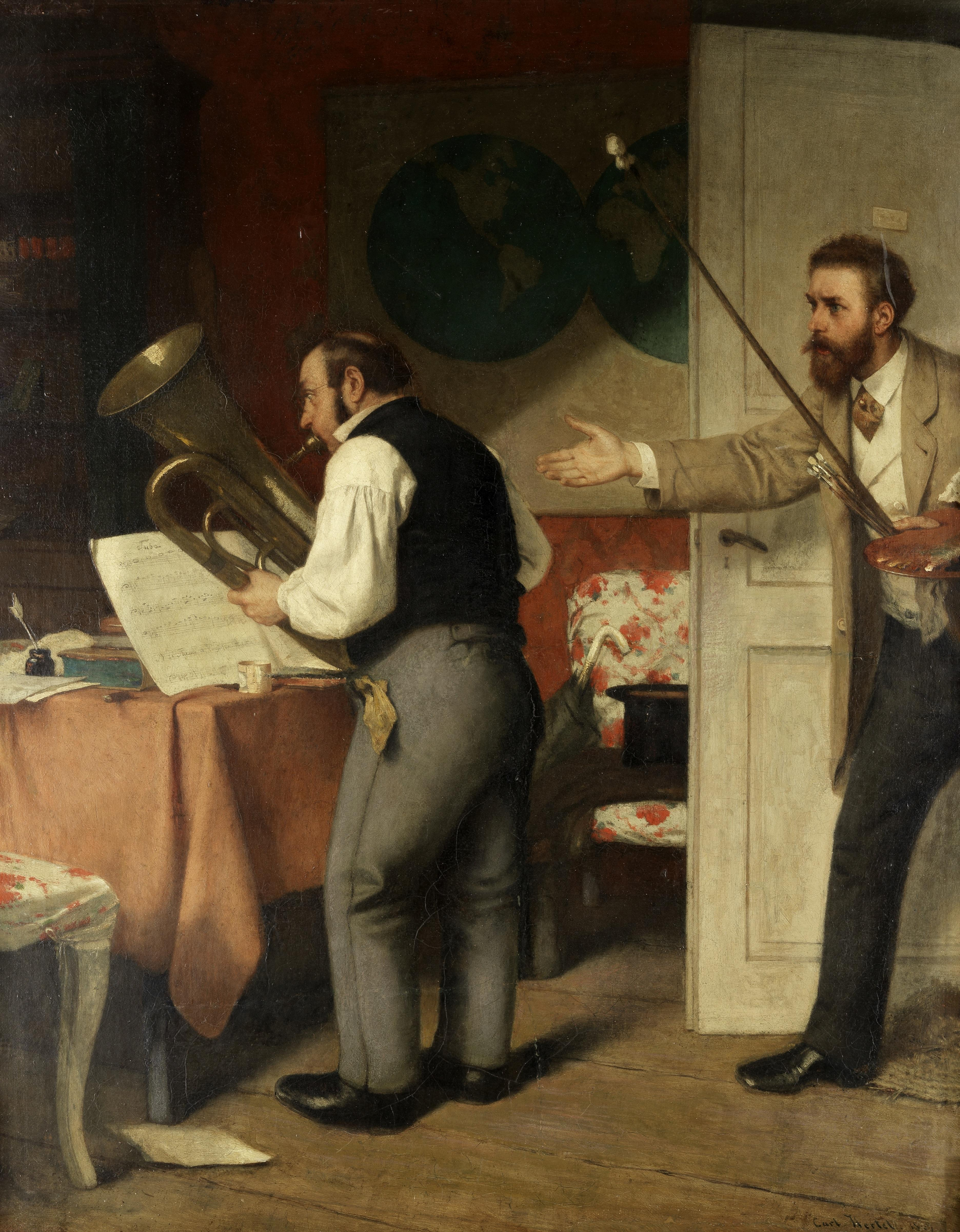
The Musicians or The Artist, Interrupted

Carl Conrad Julius Hertel (17 October 1837 – 10 March 1895) was a German genre painter, associated with the Düsseldorfer Malerschule.

== Life and work ==
He was born in Breslau. From 1855 to 1858, he attended the Kunstakademie Düsseldorf, where he was a student of Christian Köhler, Rudolf Wiegmann and Karl Müller. This was followed, until 1864, by private lessons with the genre painter, Wilhelm Sohn. He decided to settle in Düsseldorf, where he was a member of the progressive artists' group Malkasten until 1870, and again from 1880 to 1895.

He took several study trips to the Netherlands and Belgium. Between 1861 and 1890, he exhibited his works throughout the German-speaking nations; including nine showings in Berlin, four in Dresden, three in Düsseldorf, two in Hannover, and one each in Vienna (1882) and Bremen (1890). In 1869, he was one of the thirty-eight signatories to an open letter opposing the appointment of Hermann Wislicenus as a professor of history painting, which was done against the will of the teaching staff, and criticizing the head of the board of directors at the Akademie, Hermann Altgelt. The letter, sent to the Prussian Ministry of Culture, accused Altgelt of exercising "such an essential influence on the artistic direction and on the training of prospective artists that views of proven artists could not come into their own". He resigned in 1870.

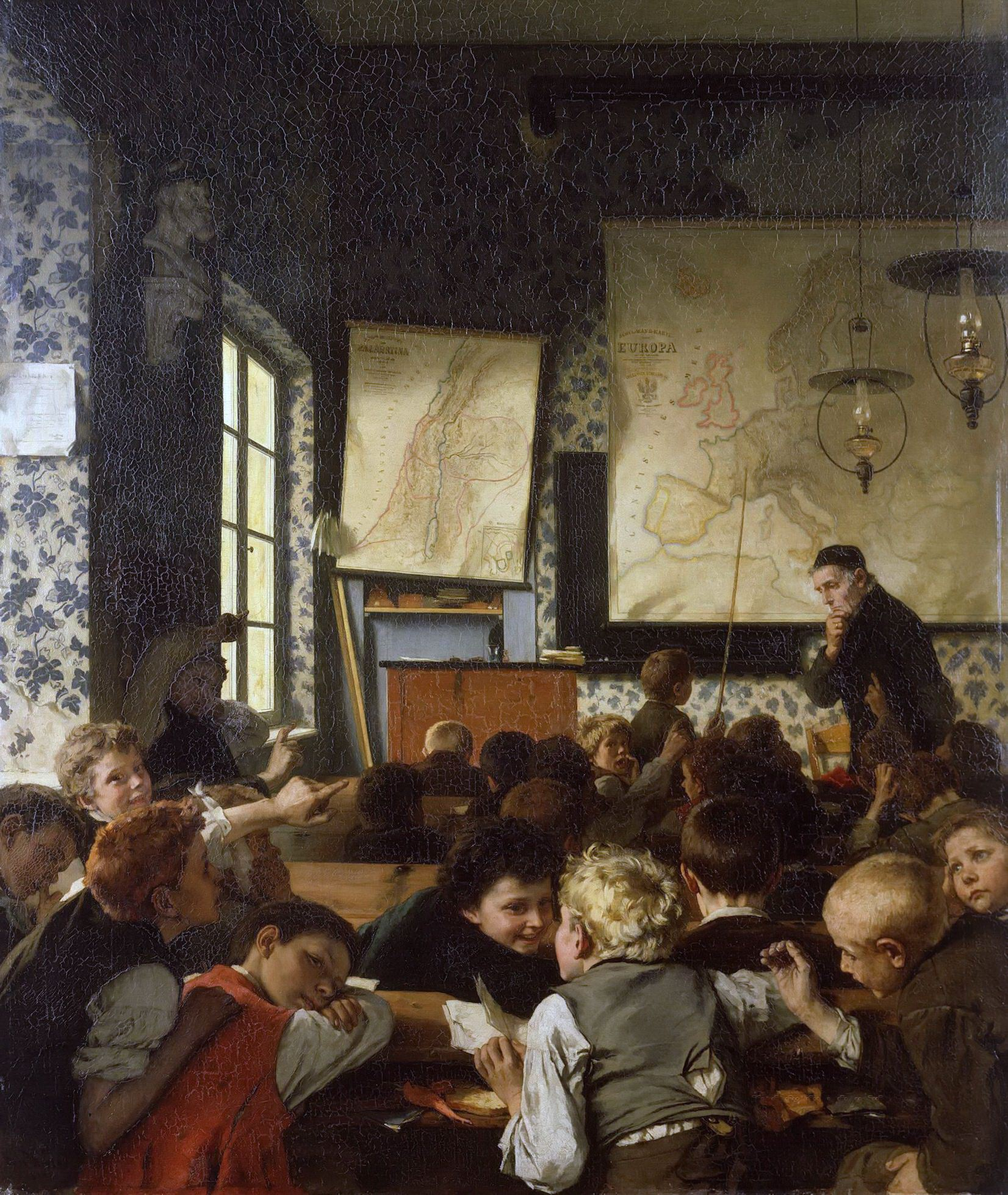
Young Germany in School

His best known, and most controversial, painting was the satirical Jung-Deutschland in der Schule (Young Germany in School), depicting students in a geography class. Max Jordan, the Director of the National Gallery, thought highly of it and bought it for the museum in 1874. That same year, a critic for the magazine, Dioskuren, which was a major promoter of the "Young Germany" ideology, saw the scene as a political issue and described the classroom as a "nursery school for budding convicts as future citizens", not a satire on their movement.

Hertel died in 1895 in Düsseldorf.
