= Dębicki =

Dębicki (Polish: [dɛmˈbitski]; feminine: Dębicka, plural Dębiccy) or Debicki is a Polish-language surname derived from place names such as Dębica and Dębica County. Notable people with the surname include:

- Edward Dębicki (born 1935), Polish-Ukrainian Romani poet and musician
- Elizabeth Debicki (born 1990), Australian actress
- Stanisław Dębicki (1866–1924), Polish painter
- Tadeusz Dębicki (born 1945), Polish politician
