= Grudziński =

Grudziński (feminine: Grudzińska, plural: Grudzińscy) is a Polish surname. It may refer to:

- Gustaw Herling-Grudziński (1919–2000), Polish writer
- Jan Grudziński (1907–1940), Polish submarine commander
- Joanna Grudzińska (1791–1831), Polish noblewoman
- Piotr Grudziński (1975–2016), Polish guitarist
- Zygmunt Grudziński (1560–1618), voivode of Rawa
- Zygmunt Grudziński (1568–1653), voivode of Inowrocław and Kalisz
- Zygmunt Grudziński (radiologist) (1870–1929), Polish radiologist
