= Trzy Kawki coat of arms =

Polish coat of arms

Trzy Kawki
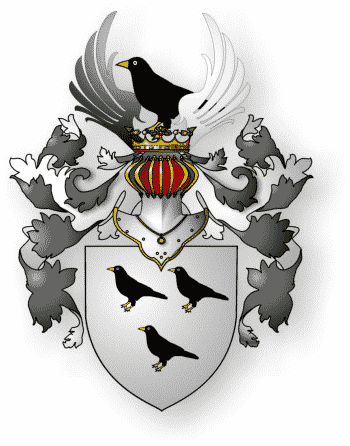
- Alternative names: Borch, Trzy kruki
- Families: Borch

Trzy Kawki (Polish for "Three Jackdaws") is a Polish coat of arms. It was used by the noble family of Borch.

== Blazon ==
Argent, three jackdaws sable

== Notable bearers ==
Notable bearers of this coat of arms have included:

- Count Jan Andrzej Józef Borch h. Trzy Kawki
- Jan Andrzej Borch, Kanclerz
- Teodor, Bishop of Poznan

== Reference in literature ==
A bearer of the "Trzy Kawki" coat of arms is the fictional knight, Borch, in Andrzej Sapkowski's novel.

== See also ==
- Polish heraldry
- Heraldic family
- List of Polish nobility coats of arms

== Bibliography ==
- Kasper Niesiecki: Herbarz polski... powiększony dodatkami z późniejszych autorów, rękopismów, dowodów urzędowych, wyd. J. N. Bobrowicz, t. 1–10, Lipsk 1839–1845,
