= Ogończyk coat of arms =

Polish coat of arms

Ogończyk
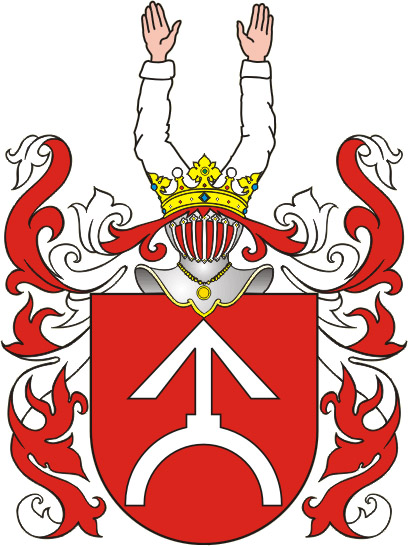
- Battle cry: Powała, Sudkowicz
- Alternative names: Cauda, Hogon, Ogon, Ogoniec, Powała, Pogończyk
- Earliest mention: 1384
- Cities: Nekla, Pińczów
- Gminas: Gmina Boniewo, Gmina Kikół, Gmina Kotlin
- Families: 566 names Afri, Aklewicz, Akulewicz, Augiński, Augustynowski, Azarewicz, Baliński, Barłowski, Bechowski, Benedyktowicz, Bereski, Berewski, Białobłocki, Biechowski, Bielecki, Bielicki, Biszewski, Blech, Blikowski, Bloch, Blokowski, Blom, Błocha, Błochin, Bodenbruch, Bogorski, Bogurski, Bohdziewicz, Boniewski, Bonisławski, Borowiecki, Borowik, Borowski, Borysewicz, Borysiewicz, Borysowicz, Branecki, Broniewski, Bruchan, Brzuchański, Buczkowski, Bukowiecki, Bułacki, Bułat, Bułatowicz, Butowicz, Butowiecki, Campe, Canpe, Chajkowski, Chmielewski, Chodecki, Chodorąski, Chodorecki, Chodoreński, Chodoręski, Chudziński, Chwal, Chwalęcki, Cicholewski, Cichrowski, Ciecholewski, Ciepliński, Cieśliński, Cym, Cymiński, Cynk, Czamański, Czarnołucki, Czarnorucki, Czarnorudzki, Czarnotulski, Czarnotyński, Czarpiński, Czerski, Czetkowski, Czychrowski, Czyrski, Czyszkowski, Czyżkowski, Czyżowski, Ćwikłowski, Dalibowski, Dalkowski, Dąbrowski, Dmosiński, Dmoszewski, Dmoszyński, Dmuszewski, Dobiecki, Dobiesławski, Dobrochowski, Dobruchowski, Dogonowski, Domajewski, Domajowski, Domasławski, Domasłowski, Domaszowa, Drwalewski, Drzewiecki, Dubiecki, Dubieniecki, Dziadkowski, Działyński, Dzieńciołowski, Dzierżewski, Dzięciołowski, Falkowski, Fedko-Kozłowicz, Fidelicki, Gabszewicz, Geryński, Gliwicz, Głębocki, Głuczyński, Goczewski, Godziszewski, Godziwski, Golbicki, Golennów, Goleń, Goleński, Goliński, Gołembski, Gołeński, Gołębski, Gołyński, Gornicki, Goryński, Gorzechowski, Gorzecki, Gorzędowski, Gorzycki, Goszewski, Góra, Górecki, Górnicki, Grabowski, Grodek, Grodzicki, Grodziecki, Grodź, Grosicki, Grządkowski, Hajek, Hajko, Hajkowicz, Hajkowski, Hayko, Holt, Horodeński, Idzikowski, Jacewicz, Jachimowicz, Jachomowicz, Jagustynowski, Jakimowicz, Jakubowski, Jałbrzyk, Janczewski, Janiszewski, Jankowski, Jarosz, Jasionowicz, Jassonowicz, Judziewicz-Sangowicz, Jurkowski, Juszyński, Kadzidłowski, Kamieński, Kamiński, Kijewski, Kikolski, Kirkil, Klepacki, Kłocki, Kłoczko, Kłodzki, Kłodzko, Kłodzkowski, Koblewski, Kochański, Koczmier, Kołakowski, Koncerewicz, Koncerowicz, Konczakowski, Kończak, Kończakowski, Kończyc, Korecki, Korzeniowski, Kostolicki, Kościelecki, Kościelski, Kotlewski, Kotliński, Kotwiński, Kotyński, Kozakowicz, Kozicki, Koziorowicz, Koziorowski, Kozłowicz, Krafft, Kraft, Kruszewski, Krynkowski, Kucborski, Kucieński, Kuciński, Kuczkowski, Kuczyński, Kumelski, Kuszel, Kutno, Kutnowski, Lastyński, Lemiesz, Lesiewski, Lesiowski, Leszewski, Leszowski, Leurman, Leźnicki, Leżajski, Leżnicki, Lipnicki, Lisowski, Lissowski, Lodowski, Lubiecki, Ludwigowski, Ludwikowski, Łazieński, Łaziński, Łempicki, Łętowski, Łodygowski, Łodziat, Łukowski, Magmiszewski, Magnuszewski, Makowski, Malanowski, Malinowski, Malonowski, Malski, Maluski, Małuj, Małuja, Markos, Markusz, Markuszewicz, Markuz, Marsztyn, Mąkowski, Męciński, Męczyński, Mętowski, Mienusiński, Mierosławski, Mierowiński, Mierzwicki, Mierzwiński, Mierzyński, Mietelski, Mijakowski, Mikołajewski, Mirosławski, Mniewski, Mniszek, Moczulski, Mońkowski, Morawiec, Morawski, Morewicz, Mościcki, Murzynowski, Mysłakowski, Mysłowski, Myślakowski, Nadrowski, Naumow, Niedrwicki, Niedrwiecki, Niedrzwicki, Niedrzwiński, Niedźwiecki, Niedźwiedzki, Niemyjski, Niemyski, Nowacki, Obrąpalski, Ochmistrzowicz, Odoliński, Oganowski, Ognicki, Ogon, Ogonowski, Ohryszko, Ohryzko, Old, Olt, Ongirski, Opruth, Ossowski, Ostałowski, Ostrowicki, Ozelewski, Pacławski, Pacyński, Paczławski, Paczyński, Padzewski, Palęcki, Palędzki, Pałyński, Paprocki, Parafianowicz, Parafinowicz, Parfianowicz, Parfienowicz, Parfinowicz, Parol, Parul, Paszczycki, Paszczyński, Patyński, Piaskowski, Piączyński, Piątkowski, Piechowski, Pietras, Pietrasz, Pietraszewicz, Pilichowski, Piotras, Piotrowicz, Piórkowski, Piskarzewski, Płaczkowski, Podleski, Podłęski, Podrez, Podziewski, Pogonowski, Pogorski, Pogórski, Pogulski, Pogurski, Porczyński, Potempski, Potemski, Potępski, Powała, Proszycki, Pruszkowski, Pruszyński, Purcelewski, Puszkar, Puzynowski, Radojewski, Radomiński, Radost, Radukowski, Radziątkowski, Radzikowski, Radziszewski, Raszkowski, Rentfiński, Resznowski, Reszyński, Rętfiński, Robak, Romaszka, Romaszko, Rosiński, Roskowski, Rosnowski, Roszkowski, Rożanowski, Rożewicz, Rożkowski, Rożnowski, Rożycki, Rożyński, Różewicz, Różycki, Różyński, Rucieński, Ruciński, Ruczyński, Rudowicz, Rudowski, Ruskowski, Ruzowski, Rypka-Walowski, Rzuchowski, Sakowski, Sandecki, Sandrowicz, Sangaw, Sangowicz, Sankowicz, Sasin, Sądecki, Senczkowski, Sidorenko, Sidorowicz, Sieczkowski, Siedlewski, Sierakowski, Sieszkowski, Siewierski, Siwerski, Skarbek, Skarbieński, Skarbowski, Skorzewski, Skowierzyński, Skórzewski, Skrzyński, Skrzypieński, Skrzypczyk, Skrzypiński, Skrzyplewski, Skwarski, Skwirczyński, Smogorzewski, Smogorzowski, Sokołowski, Songin, Stachowski, Stanisławowicz, Stański, Starosielski, Starosolski, Stefanek, Stocki, Stodulski, Strupczewski, Strybil, Strzegocki, Suchodolski, Sulek, Suleński, Suliński, Sulmowski, Susz, Suszewski, Suszycki, Syrakowski, Szeszkowski, Szołowski, Szubski, Szujkowski, Szulek, Szwab, Szwederowski, Szwejkowski, Szwyjkowski, Szwykowski, Szyraj, Śmichowski, Śmiechowski, Śniechowski, Świderski, Świeciński, Świeczyński, Święciński, Święcki, Święski, Tolwiński, Tołwiński, Tomasiewicz, Tomaszewicz, Topolski, Trojan, Trojanowski, Trzebieński, Trzebuchowski, Trzeciak, Turski, Twardomański, Twardowski, Ulanowski, Uwieliński, Veselovsky, Walowski, Wałowski, Wardzinkiewicz, Wardziukiewicz, Wąpielski, Werenicz, Werenicz-Stachowski, Wesołowski, Widlicki, Wielamowicz, Wieliczki, Wieliczko, Wiercieński, Wierciński, Wierzbicki, Wierzbowicz, Wiesiełowski, Wilamowicz, Wilewski, Wirowski, Wlewski, Włoszynowski, Wojciechowski, Wojdak, Wojeński, Wojszwiłło, Wojszyk, Wolęcki, Woliński, Wolski, Woydag, Wroczyński, Wydzierzewski, Wydzierzowski, Wysłobocki, Wysocki, Zabrocki, Zabrodzki, Zagajewski, Zagajowski, Zakrzewski, Zaleski, Zaorski, Zapolski, Zarpalski, Zarzeczewski, Zbierzyński, Zboiński, Zboże, Zbożny, Zdzisławski, Zelski, Zenowiewicz, Ziemba, Ziembrowski, Zrzelski, Zwalski, Zwierzyński, Zwoliński, Zwolski, Żarpalski, Żegrowski, Żelski, Żernicki, Żołtowski, Żółtowski, Żółwiński, Żórawski, Żuk, Żukowski, Żyrnicki

Ogończyk is a Polish coat of arms. It was used by several szlachta families in the times of the Kingdom of Poland and the Polish–Lithuanian Commonwealth.

== History ==
Although the coat of arms was first mentioned in an armorial of 1384, it is probable that it stems from early mediaeval Slavic signs for marking the cattle. After the Union of Horodło of 1413 several Lithuanian boyar families were adopted to it. With time it also spread to Prussia, where several Germanized families used it.

== Blazon ==
Gules, half an argent arrow heading upwards, supported by half of a ring. Out of the crest coronet two bare maiden hands (sometimes armed hands), holding a ring, all proper.

== Notable bearers ==
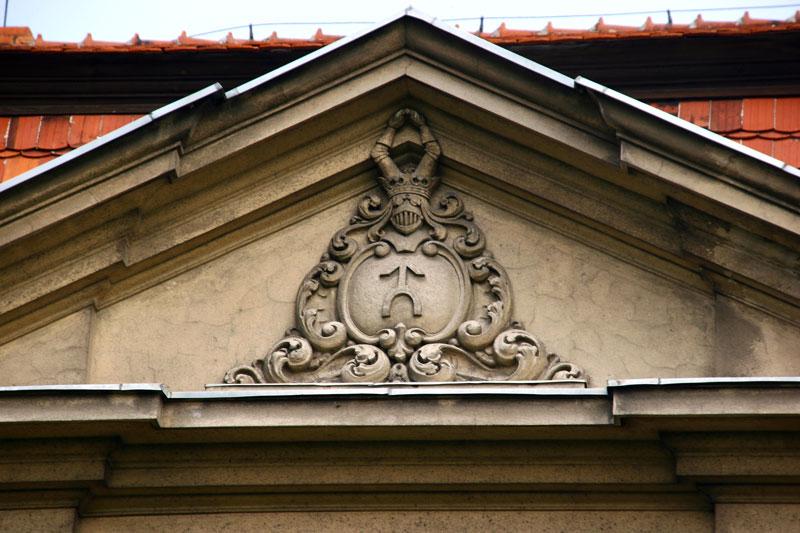
Ogończyk in the tympanon of a palace in Czacz

Notable bearers of this coat of arms include:

- Ireneusz Roszkowski (1909–1996), Polish professor, founder of modern Polish gynaecology and obstetrics, a humanist, precursor of prenatal medicine
- Wojciech Roszkowski born 1947, Polish historian and writer, Member of the European Parliament (MEP) in 2004–2009
- Teresa Roszkowska (1904–1992), Polish painter (pl)
- Wacław Roszkowski (1886–1944), Polish zoologist (pl)
- Aleksander Roszkowski born 1961, Polish painter (pl)
- Kazimierz Twardowski
- Krzysztof Wiesiołowski
- Stanisław Chodecki
- House of Działyński
  - Ignacy Działyński
- Piotr Wiesiołowski (pl)
- Ulrich von Wilamowitz-Moellendorff
- Count Jan Żółtowski
- Marceli Żółtowski
- Zbigniew Żółtowski (pl)
- Ivan Kotliarevsky (1769–1838), Ukrainian writer, poet and playwright
- Mykola Stakhovsky (1879–1948), Ukrainian diplomat, politician, medic.
- Oleksander Ohonovsky (1848–1891), Ukrainian lawyer, legal scholar, and civic leader.
- Jan Gotlib Bloch (1836–1901), Polish banker, economist, and railway contractor, advocate of universal peace.
- Ludwik Łętowski (1786–1868), Polish bishop

== See also ==
- Polish heraldry
- Heraldic family
- List of Polish nobility coats of arms

== Bibliography ==
- Bartosz Paprocki: Herby rycerstwa polskiego na pięcioro ksiąg rozdzielone, Kraków, 1584.
- Tadeusz Gajl: Herbarz polski od średniowiecza do XX wieku : ponad 4500 herbów szlacheckich 37 tysięcy nazwisk 55 tysięcy rodów. L&L, 2007. ISBN 978-83-60597-10-1.
- Alfred Znamierowski: Herbarz rodowy. Warszawa: Świat Książki, 2004. ISBN 83-7391-166-9. str. 139
