= Carol Kicinski =

American TV chef and Cookbook author

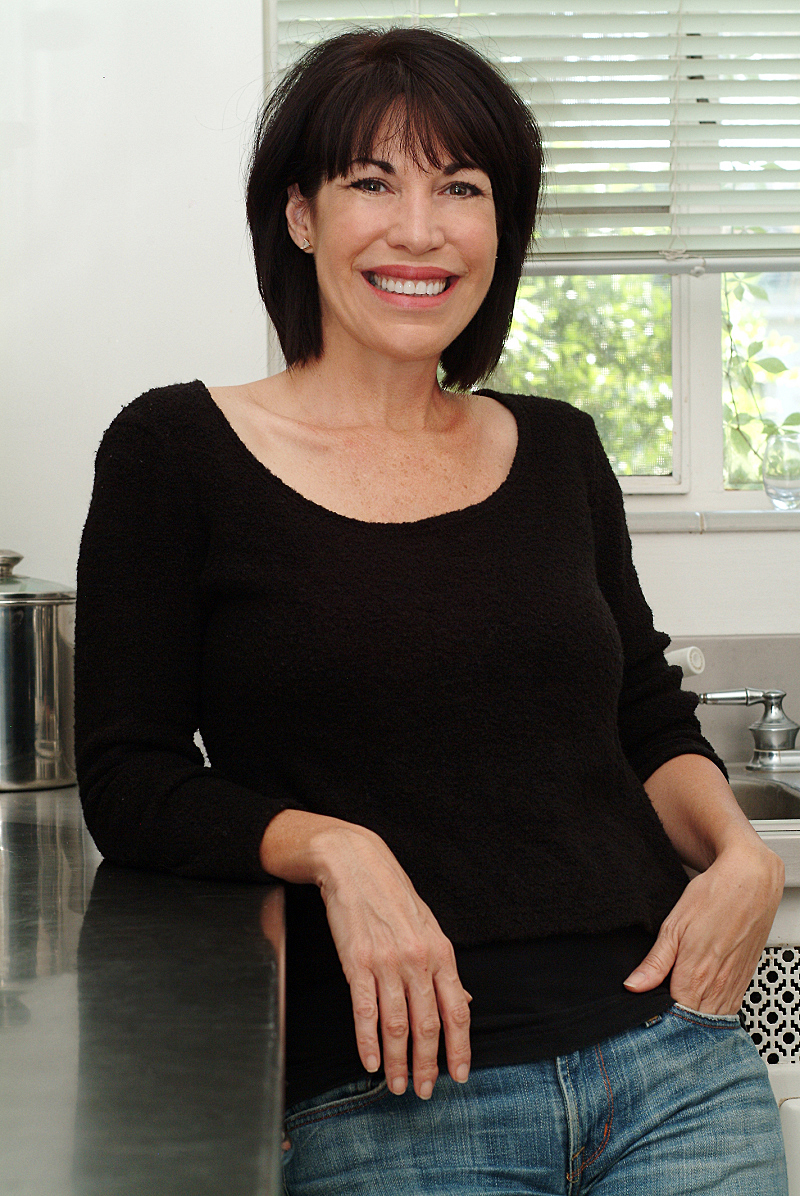
- Kicinski in 2013
- Born: Carol O'Neal Kicinski
- Writing career
- Genre: Non-fiction
- Subject: Food

Carol O'Neal Kicinski is an American gluten-free advocate, TV chef, magazine founder and editor-in-chief, gluten-free recipe developer, cookbook author, and food writer. She is the founder of Simply Gluten Free Omnimedia, Inc. Kicinski is also the founder and editor-in-chief of Simply Gluten Free magazine. She presents monthly episodes as a gluten-free TV chef on Daytime, a nationally syndicated morning television show produced by NBC-based WFLA-Tampa Bay. She has been gluten-free for more than 20 years. In 2018, Kicinski launched a gluten-free mineral makeup line, Beauté Minerals.

Kicinski was charged by federal prosecutors for her participation in the January 6 United States Capitol attack. On June 27, 2023, she was sentenced to 20 days of incarceration and one year of probation; she was also imposed a $525 fine. On January 20, 2025, after beginning his second term in office, President Trump issued pardons to roughly 1500 individuals charged with crimes connected to January 6, including Kicinski.

== Career ==
=== Magazine editor-in-chief ===
In November 2012, Kicinski launched Simply Gluten Free magazine, a national lifestyle magazine for gluten and allergen-free living. The magazine is written by gluten- and allergen-free writers as well as medical doctors and professionals. The magazine is published by Edgewater Park Media, Inc., a media company based in Dunedin, Florida, owned by Simply Gluten Free Omnimedia. The magazine is distributed in the US and Canada by Ingram Content Group.

In December 2013, Simply Gluten Free magazine received the "Hottest Launches of the Year" award by Media Industry News, an industry source on consumer and business-to-business magazine business.

In 2015, the magazine began producing special collector's editions focused on specific topics, like baking and holiday favorites.

=== Television ===
In 2009, Kicinski started doing television cooking segments on the NBC-based WFLA-Tampa Bay's Daytime TV show. The show is nationally syndicated to 140 cities, including New York, Los Angeles, Chicago and Tampa, reaching 80 million households monthly.

=== Writings ===
Kicinski has written cookbooks including Simply Gluten Free Desserts (2011), Simply Gluten Free Quick Meals (2012), Simply Gluten Free Cupcakes (2013) and Simply Gluten Free 5 Ingredient Cookbook (2016).

She has also written ten eBooks. She has contributed recipes to The Cooking Light Gluten-Free Cookbook. Kicinski was a monthly recipe contributor to Martha Stewart's Whole Living from 2011 to 2013.

=== Blog ===
The website and blog, Simply Gluten Free, was Kicinski's first platform for sharing gluten-free recipes, starting in 2007. The purpose of the website is to educate, entertain and inspire those with celiac disease or sensitivity to gluten and other food allergens to live a healthier lifestyle for themselves and their families.

In 2010, Kicinski started the Gluten-free Global Community, putting more than 340 gluten-free bloggers worldwide in communication with each other. In 2012, she started the Celiac Support Groups Community with more than 280 groups represented worldwide.

=== Recipes ===
Kicinski began developing gluten-free recipes for herself and her family more than 20 years ago when she learned she was gluten sensitive. She now does recipe development for gluten-free companies. Kicinski also developed Carol's Gluten Free All Purpose Flour.

=== Advocacy ===
Kicinski attends conventions, expos, events and celiac group meetings to speak about gluten-free living. She was an educational speaker at the Southeast Natural Products Expo in December 2012. She is a presenter at gluten-free and allergen-free events.

== Participation in the 2021 United States Capitol attack ==
Kicinski was charged by federal prosecutors for storming the U.S. Capitol on January 6, 2021, while wearing a blue "TRUMP" hat. On October 27, 2022, Kicinski pled guilty to the charge of "Entering and Remaining in a Restricted Building or Grounds". On June 27, 2023, U.S. District Judge Reggie Walton sentenced Kicinski to 20 days of incarceration and one year of probation; Walton also imposed a $525 fine on her.

On January 20, 2025, after beginning his second term in office, President Trump issued pardons to Kicinski and roughly 1,500 other individuals charged with crimes connected to January 6.

== See also ==
- List of cases of the January 6 United States Capitol attack (G-L)
- Criminal proceedings in the January 6 United States Capitol attack
- List of people granted executive clemency in the second Trump presidency
