= Grodzicki =

Grodzicki (feminine: Grodzicka; plural: Grodziccy) is a Polish surname. Notable people with this surname include:

- Johnny Grodzicki (1917–1998), American baseball player
- Krzysztof Grodzicki (died 1659), Polish general
- Rafał Grodzicki (born 1983), Polish footballer
- Stanisław Grodzicki (1912–1946), Polish fighter pilot
- Stefan Grodzicki (1947–1976), Polish equestrian
