= Gołuchowski =

Gołuchowski (feminine: Gołuchowska; plural: Gołuchowscy) is a Polish surname. Notable people with this surname include:

- Agenor Maria Gołuchowski (1849–1921), Polish-Austrian politician
- Agenor Romuald Gołuchowski (1812–1875), Polish-Austrian politician
- Józef Gołuchowski (1797–1858), Polish philosopher
