= Przeździecki =

Przeździecki (feminine Przeździecka) is a Polish surname. Notable people include:

- Aleksander Narcyz Przezdziecki (1814–1871), Polish historian
- Andrzej Przeździecki (1926–2011), Polish fencer
- Henryk Przeździecki (1909–1977), Polish footballer and ice hockey player
- Marta Przeździecka (born 1988), Polish chess player
- Wacław Przeździecki (1883–1964), Polish military officer
