= Tadeusz Dębicki =

Polish politician

member of Sejm 2005-2007
- In office 25 September 2005 – 2007

Personal details
- Born: 31 August 1945 (age 80)
- Party: Samoobrona

Tadeusz Dębicki (born 31 August 1945 in Kalisz) is a Polish politician. He was elected to the Sejm on 25 September 2005, getting 10027 votes in 36 Kalisz district as a candidate from Samoobrona Rzeczpospolitej Polskiej list.

== See also ==
- Members of Polish Sejm 2005-2007
