= Laura Kaczor =

- Born: Laura Marie Kaczor; September 16, 1982 (age 43); Collegeville, Pennsylvania, U.S.
- Origin: Nashville, Tennessee
- Genres: CCM, worship
- Occupations: Singer, songwriter
- Instruments: vocals, singer, songwriter
- Years active: 2006–present
- Labels: LifeThirst, Running Spirit
- Website: laurakaczor.org

Laura Marie Kaczor is a Christian contemporary musician, worship leader, speaker from Nashville who is a Collegeville, Pennsylvania native. She released, Wake Me Up, in 2006, with Running Spirit Records. Her second album, Love Enough, was released by LifeThirst Records, in 2010. The song, "Alive in You", was her Billboard breakthrough release and it was on the Christian Soft AC chart on Billboard. An album, Restore Me, followed; it was released in 2015, through LifeThirst Records.

== Background ==
Kaczor was born Laura Marie Kaczor in Collegeville, Pennsylvania, on September 16, 1982. Her father is Frederick "Fred" Kaczor, and her mother is Mary Kaczor. Laura has an older brother, Adam. She graduated from the University of Pennsylvania in Philadelphia in 2006. After graduation, Kaczor moved to Nashville to pursue a songwriting and musical career.

== Music history ==
Her music career commenced in 2006, when the album, Wake Me Up, was released on April 4, 2006 on Running Spirit Records. She released, Love Enough, with LifeThirst Records, on April 13, 2010. "Alive in You" was a song on the album and it made the Billboard Christian Soft AC Chart, where it peaked at No. 17. An album, Restore Me, was released on July 10, 2015, by LifeThirst Records, and produced by Ian Eskelin. She has worked with a number of contemporary Christian artists including 4Him, NewSong, Avalon; Phillips, Craig and Dean; and many others.

== Discography ==
Albums

- Wake Me Up (April 4, 2006, Running Spirit)
- Love Enough (April 13, 2010, LifeThirst)
- Restore Me (July 10, 2015, LifeThirst)

Singles

- "Invisible"
- "Alive in You" – Christian Soft AC # 17, July 2, 2011
- "Yours Forever"
