= Mieroszewski =

Mieroszewski (feminine: Mieroszewska; plural: Mieroszewscy) is a Polish surname. Notable people with this surname include:

- Ambroży Mieroszewski (1802–1884), Polish painter
- Juliusz Mieroszewski (1906–1976), Polish journalist
- Stanisław Mieroszewski (1827–1900), Polish-Austrian politician and writer
