= Skrzyński =

Skrzyński (feminine: Skrzyńska; plural: Skrzyńscy) is a Polish-language surname literally meaning "from Skrzyńsko". Notable people with this surname include:

- Aleksander Skrzyński (1882–1931), Polish politician
- Łukasz Skrzyński (born 1978), Polish footballer
- Karolina Skrzyńska (born 1988) Polish singer-songwriter
- Ludwik Kmicic-Skrzyński (1893–1972), brigadier general of the Polish Armed Forces, known as one of the Seven Lancers of Belina
