= Szaniawski =

Junosza coat of arms, used by Konstanty Felicjan Szaniawski

Szaniawski (feminine: Szaniawska, plural: Szaniawscy) is a Polish surname. Notable people with the surname include:

- Anna Szaniawska (1730–1795), Polish noblewoman
- Alfons Szaniawski (1837–1905), Russian general and activist
- Jerzy Szaniawski (1886–1970), Polish writer, playwright, and essayist
- Józef Kalasanty Szaniawski (1764–1843), Polish philosopher and politician
- Konstanty Felicjan Szaniawski (1668–1732), Polish nobleman, Bishop of Kujawy and Bishop of Kraków
- Władysław Szaniawski (1861–1931), Polish inventor
