= Giżycki =

Giżycki, feminine: Giżycka is a Polish surname. Notable people with the surname include:

- Kamil Giżycki, Polish writer, traveler, engineer, and soldier
- Krystyna Giżycka, also Krystyna Skarbek, Polish agent of the British Special Operations Executive (SOE) during the Second World War
- Marcin Giżycki, Polish film and art historian, critic, and filmmaker
- Paweł Giżycki (1692–1762), Polish Jesuit architect

== See also ==
- Giżycko
