= Maciej Kaczorowski =

Polish footballer

Personal information
- Date of birth: 20 June 1980 (age 46)
- Place of birth: Szczecin, Poland
- Height: 1.78 m (5 ft 10 in)
- Position: Forward

Senior career*
Years	Team	Apps	(Gls)
1998–2004	Pogoń Szczecin	51	(1)
2002–2003	→ Arka Gdynia (loan)	28	(4)
2004	GKS Bełchatów	21	(1)
2005	Ruch Chorzów	9	(0)
2005–2006	FSV Optik Rathenow	4	(0)
2006	Flota Świnoujście		
2007	FSV Ulstertal Geisa 1866		
2008	GKS Mierzyn		
2010	Drawa Drawsko Pomorskie		
2010	VfB Pommern Löcknitz		
2011–2012	Pomorzanin Przybiernów		
2012	GKS Mierzyn		
2014	Ehrle Polska Dobra Szczecińska		
- * Club domestic league appearances and goals

Maciej Kaczorowski (born 20 June 1980) is a Polish former professional footballer who played as a forward.
