= Sumiński =

Suminski or Sumiński (feminine: Sumińska; plural: Sumińscy) is a Polish surname. It may refer to:

- Dave Suminski (1931–2005), American football player
- Michał Hieronim Leszczyc-Sumiński (1820–1898), Polish botanist and painter
