= Sieminski =

Sieminski (masculine), Sieminska (feminine) and Siemieński (masculine), Siemieńska (feminine) are Polish surnames. Notable people with the surname include:

- Alfred Dennis Sieminski (1911–1990), American politician
- Chuck Sieminski (1939–2020), American football player
- Edmund Sieminski (1932–2021), American politician
- Józef Siemieński (1882–1941), Polish archivist and historian of law
- Lucjan Siemieński (1807–1877), Polish poet
- Roman Siemiński, Polish cyclist, the namesake of the Memoriał Romana Siemińskiego
