= Zbyszewski =

Zbyszewski is a surname of Polish origin. Notable people with the surname include:

- Georges Zbyszewski (1909–1989), Russian-born French geologist and paleontologist
- Matt Zbyszewski (born 1981), Canadian volleyball player and coach
- Paul Zbyszewski (born 1970), American television writer and producer
- Wiktor Zbyszewski (1818–1896), politician
