= Lasocki =

Lasocki (feminine: Lasocka; plural: Lasoccy) is a Polish surname. People with this surname include:

- Andrzej Lasocki (born 1945), Polish triple jumper
- Józef Adam Lasocki (1861–1931), Polish general
- Rafał Lasocki (born 1975), Polish footballer
