= Richard Wellington McLaren =

American judge

Judge of the United States District Court for the Northern District of Illinois
- In office January 26, 1972 – February 25, 1976
- Appointed by: Richard Nixon
- Preceded by: Julius Hoffman
- Succeeded by: Stanley Julian Roszkowski

Personal details
- Born: Richard Wellington McLaren; April 21, 1918 Chicago, Illinois
- Died: February 25, 1976 (aged 57) Chicago, Illinois
- Education: Yale University (BA, LLB)

Richard Wellington McLaren (April 21, 1918 – February 25, 1976) was a United States district judge of the United States District Court for the Northern District of Illinois.

== Education and career ==
Born on April 21, 1918, in Chicago, Illinois, McLaren received a Bachelor of Arts degree from Yale University in 1939 and a Bachelor of Laws from Yale Law School in 1942, and thereafter briefly entered private practice in New York City, New York. He was in the United States Army Air Forces during World War II, serving from 1942 to 1946, where he attained the rank of captain. Afterwards, he returned to private practice in New York. In 1950, he moved back to Chicago. He became an Assistant Attorney General of the United States, supervising the Antitrust Division from 1969 until his appointment to the federal bench. As Assistant Attorney General, he argued for the Government in the United States Supreme Court in Blonder-Tongue Labs., Inc. v. University of Ill. Foundation and FTC v. Sperry & Hutchinson Co.

== Federal judicial service ==
McLaren was nominated by President Richard Nixon on December 2, 1971, to a seat vacated by Judge Julius Hoffman on the United States District Court for the Northern District of Illinois. He was confirmed on December 2, 1971, and received his commission on January 26, 1972. He remained on the court until his death of the effects of an undisclosed debilitating illness on February 25, 1976, in Chicago.

== Sources ==
Legal offices
Preceded by Edwin Zimmerman	United States Assistant Attorney General for the Antitrust Division; 1969–1972	Succeeded by Walker B. Comegys
Preceded by Julius Hoffman	Judge of the United States District Court for the Northern District of Illinois; 1972–1976	Succeeded by Stanley Julian Roszkowski
