= Ireneusz Roszkowski =

Polish nobleman and professor

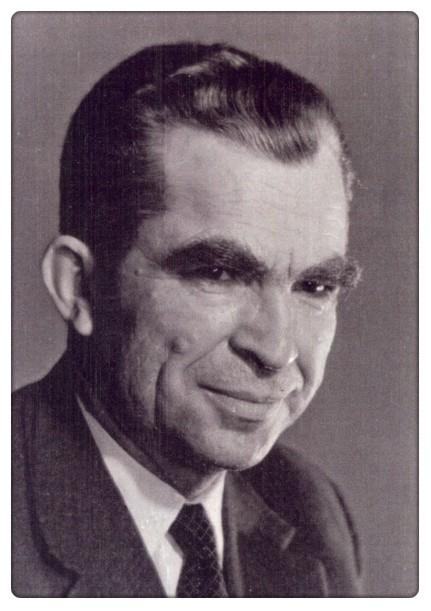
- Roszkowski in the 1970s
- Born: 24 March 1910; Łapy, Poland
- Died: 21 April 1996 (aged 86); Warsaw, Poland
- Resting place: Powązki Cemetery
- Citizenship: Polish
- Education: University of Warsaw
- Known for: First in the world Laboratory of Experimental Embryology; Latzko-Tausig-Roszkowski (LTR) method; operatio crutiata method
- Awards: Order of Polonia Restituta; Golden Cross of Merit; Medal for Sacrifice and Courage

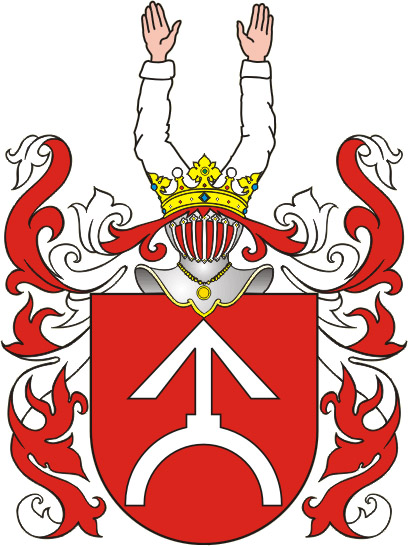
Ogończyk – Coat of arms of Ireneusz Roszkowski

Ireneusz Roszkowski (24 March 1910 – 21 April 1996) was a Polish nobleman, professor, founder of modern Polish gynaecology and obstetrics, a humanist, precursor of prenatal medicine, a supporter of midwives.

== Early life and education ==
Ireneusz Roszkowski born on 24 March 1909, in Łapy in the Białystok region, into a family with patriotic noble traditions, with the coat of arms Ogończyk, eldest son of Franciszek and Natalia (née Wnorowska). He had three brothers: Kazimierz, Stanisław and Józef; and three sisters: Jadwiga, Regina and Hanna. His maternal grandparents actively took part in the January Uprising (1863); both of them were deported to Siberia, never to return. His grandfather's brother Jan, also an insurgent, fled with raftmen to Gdańsk and then on to the United States. A need for education/training, self-development, work and mutual assistance reigned within the family.

In 1928 he graduated from the Tadeusz Kościuszko High School in Łomża. He actively took part in the scouts. Even at this stage his organizational skills were obvious. In later years, he repeatedly stressed the importance of scouting in the education of the young. For a few years in high school he fenced with a passion.

He began his studies at the University of Warsaw in the Faculty of Law, after passing the first year, he moved to the Faculty of Medicine.

In 1935, he graduated from the Faculty of Medicine at Warsaw University. During his studies he attended lectures with such as professors: Mściwój Semerau-Siemianowski, Witold Orłowski, Adam Czyżewicz, Tadeusz Butkiewicz, Henryk Gromadzki, Dr. Roman Welman. During his studies he had to support himself, working as a lab technician with Professor Serkowski. He took an active part in student life. As the first head of construction of the Medical Student's Accommodation (Domu Medyka) on Oczki in Warsaw, he and a group of friends organized balls and film screenings to raise funds for the construction. He worked in the cardiology department with Professor (then Assistant Professor) Mściwój Semerau-Siemianowski.

== Career ==
After graduating in 1935 – 1936 he completed his military service at the Cadet's school sanitary division in Warsaw. After completing military exercises he was promoted to the rank of second lieutenant, sanitary division, allocated to the officer resources of the district hospital in Warsaw.

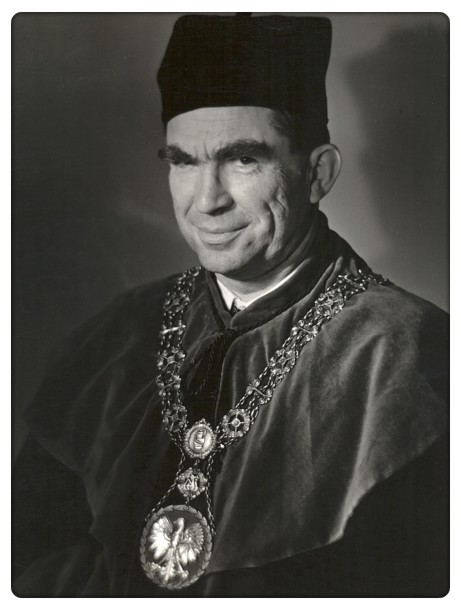
Ireneusz Roszkowski in 1960s as a Dean of the Faculty of Medicine, Medical University of Warsaw

In 1936 – 1937 he worked at the Saint Sophie Gynecological – Obstetrics unit. From 1937 he associated himself with the hospital of the Transfiguration.

In September 1939 he was drafted into the army, allocated to the Army Poznan as the Head of the chemical – bacteriological field hospital No. 202. Near Kutno, the sanitary train in which the hospital was housed, was bombed. 18 September 1939 during the battle of the Bzura River, in Sennik, Dr. I. Roszkowski was wounded and taken prisoner. On 15 October 1939, thanks to the help of his uncle Wacław Roszkowski and friend, Jerzy Niżałowski, he managed to escape from the POW camp and returned to Warsaw.

After returning to Warsaw, he returned to the Hospital of the Transfiguration, living and working there throughout the entire occupation. During the years 1937 – 1942 in the obstetrics – gynaecology wards, then from 1942 to 1944 in the surgery wards under Doctor T. Budkiewicz. Throughout those years the surgery wards were equivalent to accident and emergency. For a young doctor these were years of hard work, with continuous extra operations in addition to the scheduled ones, carried out in secret, with great risk to life as extensive gunshot wound operations (each gunshot wound had to be reported to the German authorities). Ireneusz Roszkowski was part of the team of surgeons operating on wounded soldiers from the Resistance, amongst whom, were those injured in the assassination attempt on the head of the Gestapo, Kutschera. Sometimes, a few times a week, he was called upon at night, to assist at difficult births. He never refused to help needy patients, the injured or the birthing woman.

From 1944 to 1945 he was one of the initiators and organizers of the teaching of medical students on Boremlow, which at the end of the war evolved into the structure of the Faculty of Medicine at the University of Warsaw. It was very important to him to re-launch the work of the University as quickly as possible. Many young people in the resistance worked in hospitals, but did not know what to do, as they were completely lost in the new reality. After the war, they were threatened from repressions by the security services. Learning at the higher education institution was an opportunity for them to survive and at the same time, the possibility to acquire an education.

During the years 1944 – 1946 he worked in the Obstetrics / Gynaecology clinic in Warsaw with Professor Adam Czyżewicz, after that, 1946 – 1951 he moved to Gdańsk as the professor's assistant and then Assistant Professor at the Obstetrics / Gynaecology clinic of the Medical Academy with Professor Henry Gromadzki.

His PhD thesis which he defended in 1946 (PAU 1945, No. 10,291) was entitled "The Blood Morphology in birth infections and its meaning in determining severity and prognosis". His professorial thesis entitled "The thyroid and ovulation mechanism", was presented and defended on 8 July 1947 before the Council of the Faculty of Medicine at the Medical Academy in Gdansk ("Polish Gynaecology magazine" 1948 No. 4). Associate Professor in 1953 and Professor in 1976.

From 1951 to 1955, he was the Head of the Obstetrics and Gynaecology Clinic of the University of Medical Sciences in Poznan on Polna Street. The Poznan Clinic was a large centre, but the organization of care for pregnant women was old fashioned. This involved a high mortality rate amongst mothers, fetuses and newborns. In a very short time Roszkowski introduced in Poznan and for the first time in Poland, "trauma meetings", discussing cases of complicated births. High prenatal mortality was due, amongst other reasons, to the fact that neither analysis of the reasons for death, nor autopsies of the fetuses and newborns were carried out. Roszkowski introduced changes in the care of pregnant and birthing women in his capacity as the national specialist on the National Council of the Polish Society of Gynecologists. In 1953 he delivered his paper "Methods used in the fight to reduce perinatal mortality" to the council. Since then, analysis of the causes of death of fetuses and newborns is carried out by a team including obstetricians, neonatologists, pathologists, bacteriologists, immunologists, neurologists, biochemists and other disciplines, depending on the specific clinical situation. Perinatal mortality has been reduced sevenfold.

Roszkowski organized the first Polish pathology of pregnancy wards, first in Gdansk, then in Poznan and finally the biggest ward in Warsaw on Karowa Street. In 1962 at the Conference of Polish Gynecologists in Gdansk he presented a paper on the programme entitled "Pathophysiology of fetal hypoxia". In this paper, he presented for the first time in writing, his own findings regarding hypoxia in fetuses. In 1974 at the Polish Gynaecology Society (PTG) Conference in Katowice he presented a paper titled "Pregnancy of high risk" – based on analysis of his own clinical / biochemical material.

The first Polish andrology out patient clinic dealing with male specific medical problems was organized in Poznan, where they began to explore the impact of male factors on abnormal pregnancies, especially in miscarriages. This was some of the first research of this type in the world.

During the years 1955 – 1979, for 24 years until his retirement, Roszkowski was Head of the II Clinic of Obstetrics and Gynaecology at the Medical Academy in Warsaw at Karowa Street. This was one of the most modern clinics in Central Europe, which through its clinical and scientific activities became the model for other branches. Numerous clinics were established and developed and some, which were interdisciplinary in nature, such as the experimental Embryology Laboratory or the experimental Sexology Laboratory were unique units on a global scale. During these years, of the 10,319 patients, no deaths were reported amongst women associated with pregnancy or childbirth.

Roszkowski was a skilled surgeon. He implemented a number of his own modification in operating methods in association with the reproductive organ.

- While working in the Gdansk clinic he developed his own unique techniques in extended hysterectomy operations as a result of cervical cancer, incorporating operational methods described by Latzko and Tausig. This type of operation became known as the Latzko-Tausig-Roszkowski (LTR) method. The purpose was to cut as wide a sector of the lymphatic and connective tissue and ligaments in the pelvic region and perivaginal structure including the upper half of the vagina. This extended hysterectomy operation was the fourth method used in the world but the first in Poland. A detailed description of this operational method was presented at the XI Congress of Polish gynecologists and published in the "Polish Gynaecology" magazine in 1952, Issue 2.
- He developed an original method of surgery for the treatment of stress incontinence, which consisted of two cross-seam stitches under the urethra (known as operatio crutiata).
- He also developed his own method of removing uterine myoma.
- He developed extended information in preventative methods in dealing with tumours of the uterus and ovary. These procedures have helped in the unnecessary removal of the ovary in young women.

Throughout his career, he focused on reducing intraoperative and postoperative complications. His surgical work and knowledge of anatomy enabled him to perform complex gynecological and oncological procedures. He treated patients from across Poland, including cases referred for their complexity.

Some of the following methods were introduced for the first time in Poland:

- In 1959, the obstetrical vacuum was used at the clinic on Karowa Street.
- The method of freezing was used in treating erosions of the cervical vaginal shield.
- The colposcopy method of examination of the shield part of the vagina in patients at risk of developing cervical cancer was introduced in the early sixties.
- In 1965 for the first time, ultrasound was used to check both obstetric and gynecological patients.
- The polycardiogram was introduced for the first time in the country to listen to the heartbeat of the fetus.
- The system of "rooming in" in other words (mother and child together) was organized in the Maternity Ward of this clinic.
- The first laboratories of gynecological pathology and cytogenetic in Warsaw were opened.
- He was the first initiator and organizer of the "szkół matek – mother’s school". There were 650 of these in 1954. They later evolved into "Szkoły Rodzenia – Birthing schools".
- In the 1950s he worked on special Partogram cards, which record all the parameters occurring during labour. This card was further introduced throughout Poland and became the lasting legacy in obstetrics.

Roszkowski understood and recognized the profession of midwifery. He created the main teaching institute of midwifery in Warsaw at the Karowa clinic. He contributed to the creation of a Midwifery section in the Polish Gynaecology Institute. This section enabled the improvement of many topics associated with the profession of midwives, such as upgrading the professional skills and improving the organizational structure of the profession. The midwife became an equal partner with a specific scope of duties and a higher level of independence. The Warsaw School of Midwifery at the Karowa clinic had its own teaching staff. Students of the school and medical students attended practical lessons throughout all the hospital departments. Cooperation and healthy competition resulted in excellent teaching results. Roszkowski himself ran the practical exams with each student, before they attended the state exam. The essential result was the upgrading of the professional skills of midwives and the possibility of post-graduate education at universities not only in the field of medicine, but also psychological and pedagogical.

In 1995 the Warsaw Midwifery School was given the name Professor Ireneusz Roszkowski School. The professor was present for the ceremony.

In 1968 – 1979 Roszkowski devoted a lot of time researching the causes of certain birth defects, particularly the free amino acids in the mother's blood plasma and later, both parents of children born with congenital defects.

His work spanned the fields of pathophysiology and pathology. All his procedures were dominated by concern for the welfare of the patient and their problems and he passed on these characteristics to many students and colleagues. He trained a large group of medical specialists, scientists and academics both in Poznan and Warsaw. He habilitated 18 lecturers, led 30 doctors to their doctorates, reviewed 22 doctorate works, wrote six opinions on Professor Ordinare and Extraordinare theses. Under his leadership, his assistants wrote more than 640 scientific papers (in clinics in Poznan and Warsaw). Under his watchful eye many other clinic, hospital and departmental administrators were educated. He was known for assessing the capabilities and suitability of his colleagues for scientific work.

Professor Roszkowski's organizational and scientific activities far outgrew the boundaries of just midwifery and gynaecology. He was the author of 330 scientific papers, including 50 published abroad and was the editor of several manuals.

- "Obstetrics and Female Diseases" PZWL 1954, edited by H. Gromadzki, J.Beck. I. Roszkowski, Lorentowicz. At the time, it was the only manual of obstetrics and gynaecology, released after the liberation and played a fundamental role in teaching students and doctors.
- "Acute Infectious Diseases", PZWL 1957, a collective work edited by Dr Wszelak. He was the author of the chapter "Infectious Diseases in Pregnancy" PZWL 1957 a collective work led by Dr Wszelak. Roszkowski was the author of the chapter "Infectious diseases in pregnancy and the postpartum period".
- "Modern Therapies", PZWL 1961 led by Dr Złotnicki. Roszkowski was the author of five chapters.
- "Obstetrics and Female Diseases" PZWL 1967, he was the editor of this collective work and author of six chapters.
- "Gender Frigidity Problems" PZWL 1972. I. Roszkowski, K. I Imieliński.
- "Gynacology and Obstetrics for Secondary Medical Schools" PZWL 1973. He was the editor of the handbook for midwives, which, for the first time in Poland, contained the latest data on the pathology of pregnancy in terms of the status of the fetus and newborn. This also fulfilled the role of a textbook for medical students and was widely used by medical students at the time.
- "Healthy Women" PZWL 1973 – the most important popular item amongst the Professor's works. This contains the most important behavioural guidelines for women during their lives, but most importantly during their pregnancy.

His scientific works include subjects such as: the etiology of birth defects, premature birth, liver disease in pregnancy, cholestasis in pregnancy, pathophysiology of blood coagulation in pregnancy, gestational diabetes, infections in pregnancy, procedural treatment for deliveries, organization of medical care during pregnancy, delivery and the newborn, the implementation of original operational techniques in gynaecology.

Most Important Publications:

- “Carrying out difficult births from the point of view of the good of the fetus”.
- Polish Doctor's Weekly, 1953
- “Mortality of fetuses and newborns – causes and prevention”. Polish Pediatrics, 1953.
- “Thrombophlebitis and its immediate aftermath in obstetrics and gynaecology”. XVI meeting of Polish gynecologists, Krynica 1960.
- “The Effect of the Male Factor on Abnormal Pregnancy”. Gynaecologia, 1962.
- “Inflammation of the vagina and urinary tract infection". Gynaecologia. Poland 1963.
- “Relative Weight-Deficiency in the Newborn”. Biology Neonatorum Gynaecologia, 1964.
- “Serum Iron Deficiency during the Third Trimester of Pregnancy”. Obstetrics and Gynaecology, 1966.
- “The Role of Suspected Toxoplasmosis and Coincidental Factors in the Cause of Fatal Damage,” “American Journal of Obstetrics and Gynaecologia, 1966.
- “Icterus in Pregnancy. Part I: Biochemical Assays, Part II: the Clinical Course of Pregnancy”. American Journal of Obstetrics and Gynaecology, 1968.
- “Erythrocyte Metabolism in Pregnancy Complicated by Idiopathic Icterus”. American Journal of Obstetrics and Gynaecology, 1969.
- “Free amino acids in the blood serum of women who gave birth to children with birth defects”. Ginekologia Polska, 1968.
- “The Risk of the Caesarean Section Per to the Fetus and the Newborn in Successive Weeks of Gestation”. Prenatal Medicine, Lausanne 1972.
- “Recurrent intrahepatic cholestasis of pregnancy – biochemical and clinical”. Ginekologia Polska, 1974.
- “Free amino acids in the blood plasma of couples with children with congenital defects”. Ginekologia Polska, 1975.
- “The influence of harmful factors on the embryo and the fetus”. Ginekologia Polska, 1979.

In education, Roszkowski placed great importance on audiovisual methods. Based on his scientific and teaching experiences and clinical research, he produced dozens of films, of which 17 were presented at conferences in Poland and abroad. They were used throughout Poland for training purposes. For the film "Some causes and mechanics of damage in humans before birth" (1966), he received awards at scientific film festivals in Turin and São Paulo.

In addition to taking part in many conventions and national symposia Roszkowski attended foreign congresses in Geneva (1954), Basel (1954), Belgrade (1959), Zagreb (1962), Dubrovnik (1963), Ljubljana (1969), Prague (1961, 1963, 1965, 1967), Moscow (1963, 1973), Berlin (1965, 1967), Bratislava (1970), Rome (1972), Lausanne (1972), Athens (1973), Uppsala (1976), Dresden (1978), Vienna (1961, 1972, 1978), Leipzig (1965) and Paris (1965, 1967). He also went abroad for training purposes and on scholarships to London and Aberdeen (1962), Bethesda and New York City (1970).

From 1962 to 1982, he served as Chief editor of "Polish Gynaecology". He ensured the publication was of a very high standard and made sure that all the published articles related to the creation, not destruction of life. In one interview he said: "The law regarding the admissibility of abortion was introduced in 1956, however, thanks to me it was only realized in 1960. During those four years, I calculated I saved at least 750,000 lives of my compatriots. I did this primarily as a Pole for my country.”

Through all his working life he fought for every child, for every pregnancy. He received patients in the Planned Family clinic so as to make future mothers aware of the consequences of interrupting their pregnancy, particularly the first pregnancy.

Roszkowski was a national specialist in obstetrics and gynaecology (1952 – 1959 and 1967 – 1970). He was a regional specialist in the following provinces: Szczecin (1946–1947), Olsztyn (1947–1949), Gdansk (1945–1951), Poznan (1952–1955). He served as a regional specialist (1975–1979). From 1973 to 1979 he was the Director of the Institute of Obstetrics and Gynaecology in Warsaw.

Out of choice, he served in many capacities at medical universities and scientific societies; he served as Dean (1958–1960) and Vice Dean (1960–1962) of the Medical Academy in Warsaw; took an active role on the Boards of numerous institutions and the Ministry of Health; was a longtime member of the Government Commission on Population policy; a long time Chairman of Fetus Pathophysiology Commission PAN; a member of the Science Committee on demographics; Chairman of the Medical Demography section of PAN; Chairman of the committee on natural birth defects and fetal damage PAN; a member of the Scientific Council of the Institute of Mother and Child; a scientific expert for the Central Commission for Science for the President of the Council Of Ministers. From 1974 to 1977, he served as the President of the Polish Society of Gynaecology. He was a member of many Polish and foreign scientific societies. He received various awards in Poland and abroad.

Roszkowski especially prized the Gold Medal of the Polish Academy of Medicine that he received in 1991, for outstanding contributions to the development and humanisation of medicine. On the reverse was a notable inscription: "This Medal is a symbol of gratitude to those who create timeless values, for those who have found a place in history and in people's hearts and minds".

In his later years, he became a pomologist and beekeeper, tending his land. His library—already extensive—continued to grow, reflecting his interest in history and his fondness for collecting clocks. He was an avid reader.

Throughout his life, he followed a simple guiding principle: “If you are tired of one job, take up another.”

During his medical career, he made extensive use of the main medical library in Warsaw, ensuring he remained up to date with the latest developments in the field. He was genuinely excited by the rapid progress of medical research across many specialties and often remarked on how few young people were choosing to enter these areas.

He often repeated: "we must never forget that we belong to the species Homo sapiens. This means we must constantly improve ourselves". "This country has had poverty for 200–300 years and we complain about our neighbors on our left and right. Development is all that can help us. Initially stimulated from the outside and then through our own autonomous internal development". “One talks about human development when one goes to school but development starts much earlier, from the initial contact with one’s mother, from the first feed. I once heard an elderly lady telling off a young mother that she was not talking to her child while feeding it. She told her – talk to him, otherwise he will become a bandit... ".

== Awards ==
- Grand Cross of the Order of Polonia Restituta
- Officer's Cross of the Order of the Rebirth of Poland
- Knight's Cross of the Order of the Rebirth of Poland
- Gold Cross of Merit (22 July 1951, for outstanding scientific work in the field of Medicine) (1)
- Medal for Sacrifice and Courage
- Medal of The National Education Commission
- Merit Badge "Meritorious Doctor", Poland PRL (1983)
- Merit Badge "Meritorious Teacher", Poland PRL (1984)
- Medal for Exemplary work in the Health Service (1952)
- Gold Medal of the Polish Medical Academy "Medicus Magnus" (1991)
- Prize and Degree from the Ministry of Health for scientific work (1967)
- Scientific Award of the town of Poznan (1954)
- Prize as Rector of the Medical Academy (several times)

== Personal life ==
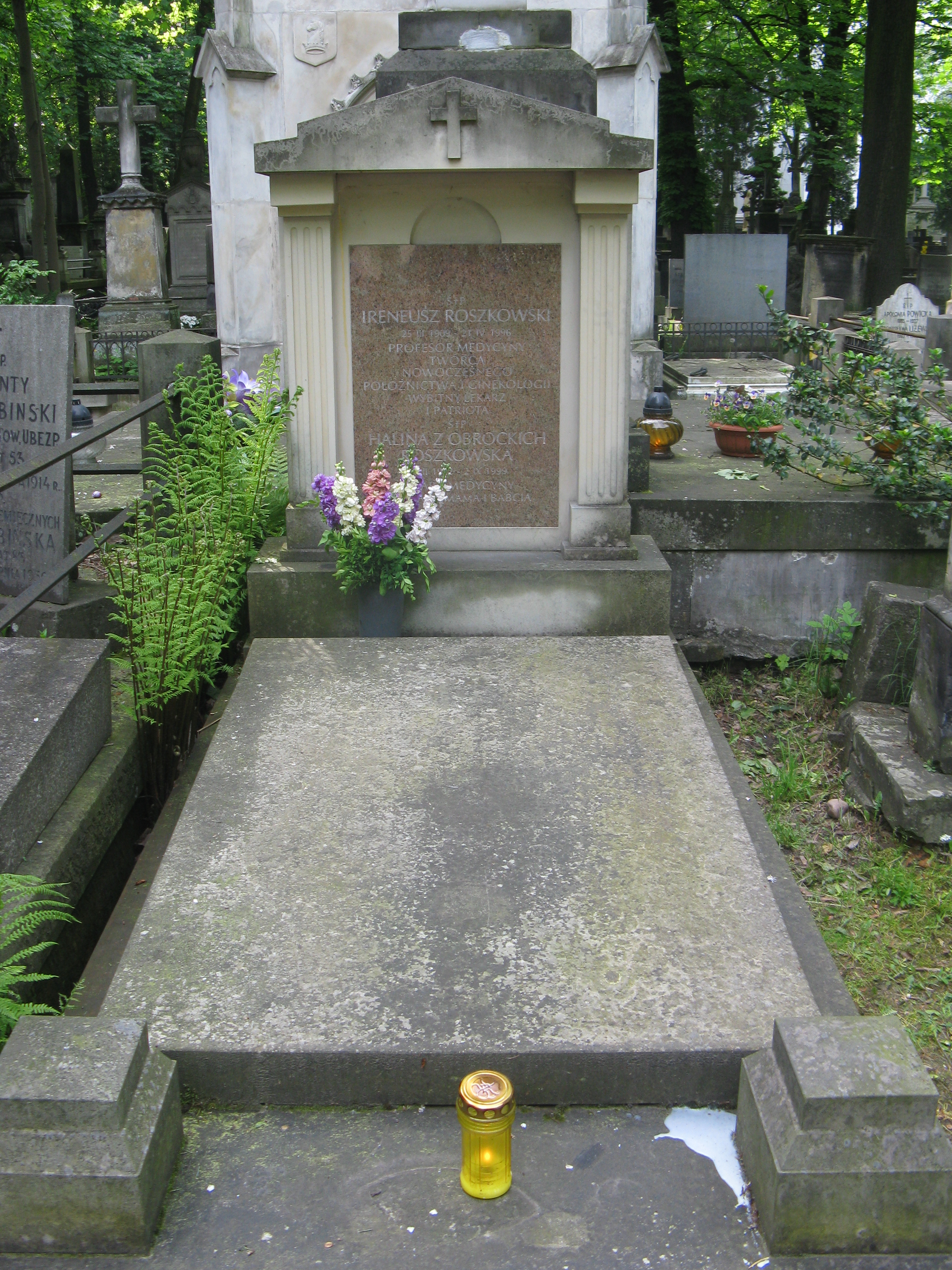
The tomb of Ireneusz Roszkowski – Powązki Cemetery

In 1949, Roszkowski married Halina Obrocka (19 February 1922 – 2 September 1999), a medical student originally from Wilno and the daughter of a lawyer. He had four children – one son, Piotr (Professor of Obstetrics and Gynaecology), and three daughters, Elżbieta (interior designer, painter), Barbara (landscape designer) and Katarzyna (Doctor of Pathological Anatomy). They had ten grandchildren (Jan, Marynia, Michał, Stefan, Stanisław, Jan, Antoni, Ludwik, Franciszek, Karol).

Roszkowski died on 21 April 1996 in Warsaw. He is buried at the Old Powązki Cemetery in Warsaw. A plaque commemorating Roszkowski was erected and solemnly dedicated at the Church of the Holy Redeemer in Warsaw on 17 November 1999. On 24 March 2009, on the 100th anniversary of Roszkowski's birth, a lecture hall in the clinic of Obstetrics and Gynaecology at the Warsaw Medical University on Karowa Street was named after him and a bust of the professor as well as a commemorative plaque were unveiled. Archbishop Henryk Hoser carried out the formal dedication of the lecture hall.

== General references ==
- Zbigniew Słomko, In tribute to the wise man of Polish Obstetrics and Gynaecology Prof. Ireneusz Roszkowski on the day of his 80th birthday, "Ginekologia Polska", 1989, 60.
- Jadwiga Kuczyńska-Sicińska, Discussion with Prof. Ireneusz Roszkowski, "Ginekologia Polska, 1989, 60.
- Michał Troszyński, Zbigniew Słomko, Memories of Professor Ireneusz Roszkowski, Ginekologia Polska, 1997, 68.
- Joanna Bień, Farewell, Bulletin, "Nurses and Midwives", Warsaw 1996.
- Memories of Professor Ireneusz Roszkowski, Bulletin "Links", publisher of the Municipal Council of Wiązowna, 1999, Nr 165.
- A. Rybka, K. Stepan, Officer Promotions in Poland 1935 – 1939, Kraków 2003.
- Personnel File Number 31/160, Warsaw Medical University Archive.
