= Czewoja coat of arms =

Polish coat of arms

Czewoja
- Battle cry: Czawoja, Czawuja, Czewoja, Czewuja
- Alternative names: Czawuja, Czewa, Czewuja, Czewye, Łzawa, Łzawia
- Earliest mention: 1409
- Towns: Prószków
- Families: 18 names altogether: Batorzyński, Boturzyński, Czeremowski, Czewoj, Fabianowski, Gluzicki, Glużycki, Gniewomir, Gromnicki, Kowalski, Libertowski, Opatowski, Piroński, Świchowski, Świechowski, Zierowski, Zyrowski, Żyrowski

Czewoja is a Polish coat of arms. It was used by several szlachta families.

== History ==
The Czewoja II was used mainly in the Kraków and Sandomierz area by around 10 families. It's theorized that it may be a mix between the Ostoja coat of arms and the Jastrzębiec coat of arms.

== Gallery ==
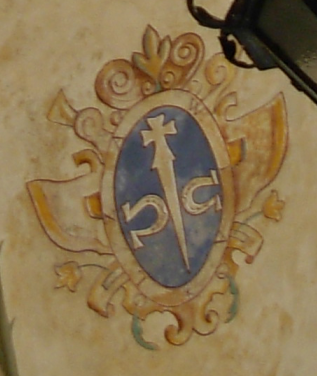
Czewoja coat of arms (Lzawa), in Baranow-Sandomierski castle

Czewoja II

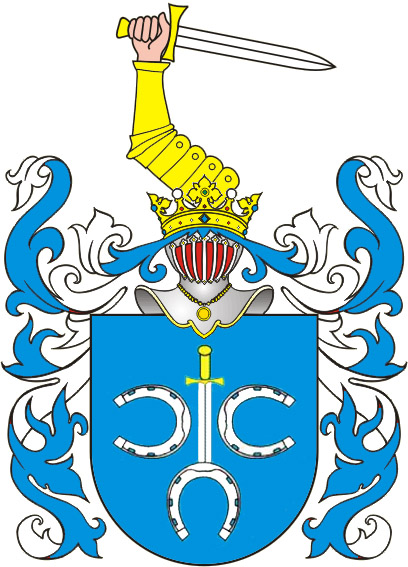
Belina

== See also ==
- Polish heraldry
- Heraldic family
- List of Polish nobility coats of arms

== Bibliography ==
- Tadeusz Gajl: Herbarz polski od średniowiecza do XX wieku : ponad 4500 herbów szlacheckich 37 tysięcy nazwisk 55 tysięcy rodów. L&L, 2007. ISBN 978-83-60597-10-1.
