= Zdzisław Suchodolski =

German-Polish painter

Zdzisław Aleksander Mamert Suchodolski
- Born: Zdzisław Aleksander Mamert Suchodolski; May 11, 1835; Rome
- Died: February 2, 1908 (aged 72); Munich
- Father: January Suchodolski

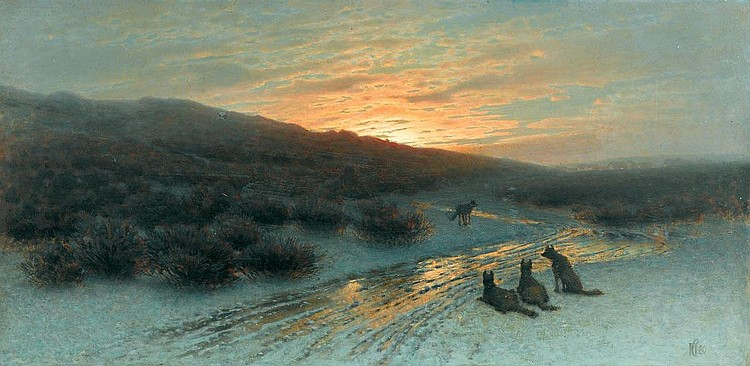
Snowy landscape with wolves at sunset, 1880

Zdzisław Aleksander Mamert Suchodolski (May 11, 1835 – February 2, 1908) was a German-Polish painter.

== Biography ==
His father was the painter and army officer January Suchodolski.

After studying in Kraków, Suchodolski went to the Kunstakademie Düsseldorf and the Düsseldorf school of painting in Düsseldorf. From 1874 to 1880 he worked in Weimar; from 1880 he lived in Munich.

His work is included in the collection of the District Museum of Suwałki, Poland.
