= Eliza Roszkowska Öberg =

Polish-Swedish political figure (born 1978)

Eliza Roszkowska Öberg (born 3 February 1978) is a Polish-Swedish political figure who, in 2008, was elected to Sweden's Parliament, the Riksdag.

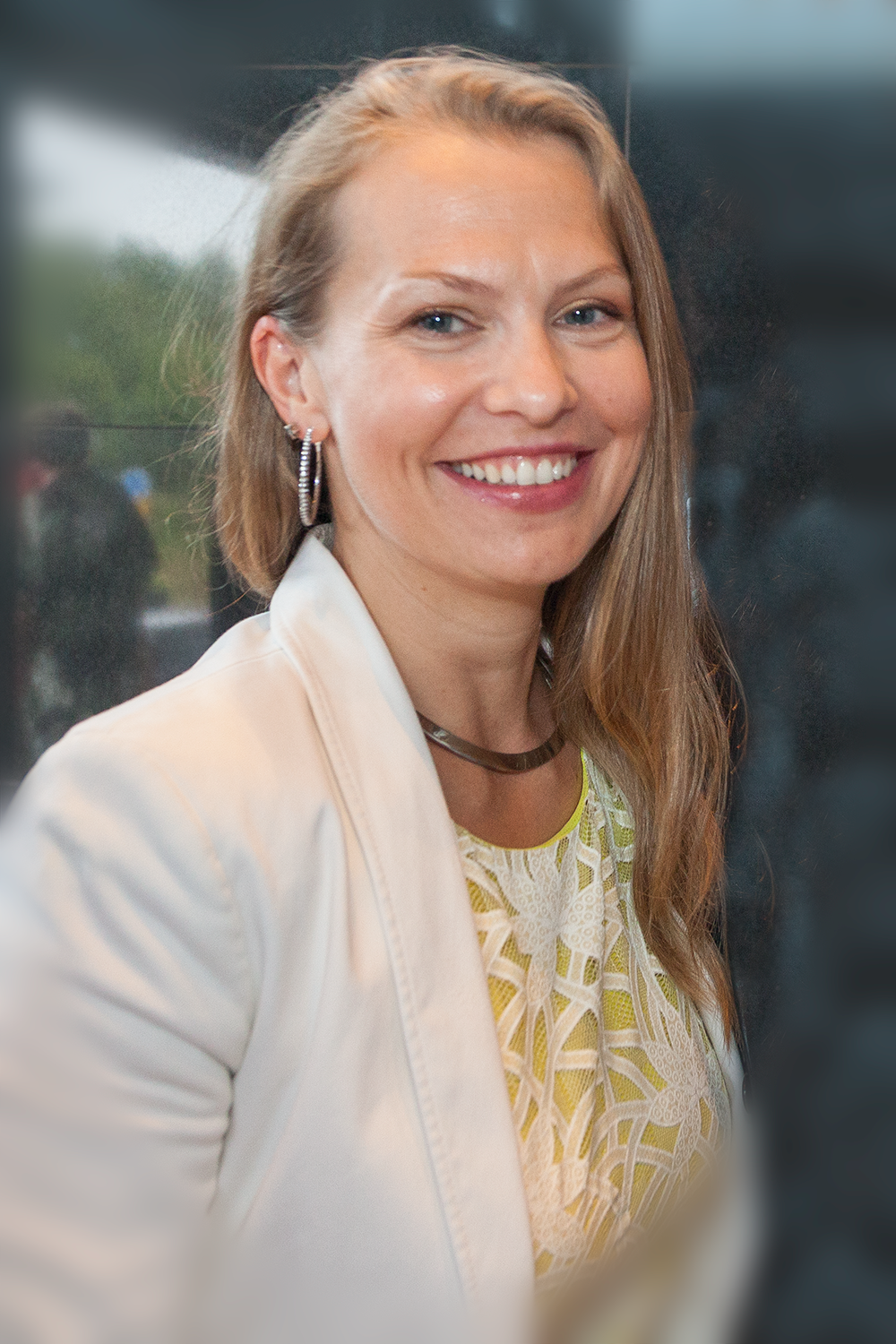
Eliza Roszkowska Öberg

A native of Warsaw, Eliza Roszkowska Öberg received her Master's degree in computer science and economics at the Polish capital's university in 2002, at the age of 24. Later that year, she relocated to Stockholm, where she served as an information technology consultant. Within two years, as a member of the Moderate Party, she ran for the Österåker municipal assembly in Stockholm County, with the county seat in the city of Åkersberga, where she resides. She is Member of the Swedish Parliament since 2006 and has currently seat 85 in the Riksdag, representing the constituency in her region of Stockholm County. Eliza Roszkowska Öberg works in the Transport and Communications Committee.
