= Czacki =

Czacki is a surname. Notable people with the surname include:

- Tadeusz Czacki (1765–1813), Polish historian and pedagogue
- Włodzimierz Czacki (1834–1888), Polish clergyman and diplomat
- blessed Róża Czacka (1876–1961), Polish philanthropist and nun
