= Wojciech Roszkowski =

Polish historian and politician

Wojciech Roszkowski MEP OOB
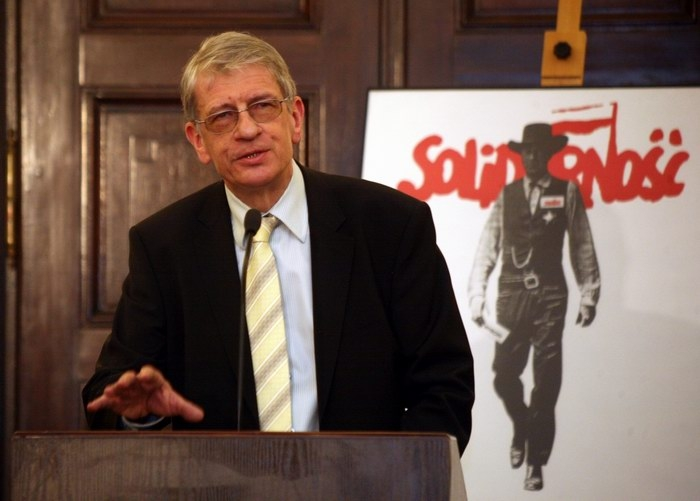

Member of the European Parliament
- In office 20 July 2004 – 13 July 2009

Personal details
- Born: 20 June 1947 (age 79) Warsaw, Poland
- Spouse: Anna Dąbrowska
- Children: Marcin Roszkowski

Wojciech Stefan Roszkowski OOB (born 20 June 1947), sometimes known by the pseudonym Andrzej Albert, is a Polish historian and politician. From 1990 to 1993, he served as vice-rector of Warsaw School of Economics and from 1994 to 2000, he was the Kościuszko Chair of Polish Studies at the University of Virginia, USA. In 2004, Roszkowski won election to the European Parliament from the Law and Justice Party for a five year term.

== Works and reception ==
Mariusz Turowski, a philosopher of historiography at University of Wrocław finds Roszkowski to be an influential exponent of the "patriotic school of Polish historiography" that gained status in post-Communist Poland; his works posited a "clash of civilization" between conservative Christian ethics and multicultural democracies. For him, the downfall of Western Civilization originated in the Age of Enlightenment, once it negated the existence of God.

Daniel Blatman, writing in 1997, noted Roszkowski to be among a new generation of post-Communist historians who tried to portray Poles as the ideal victim of Nazism as well as communism, and exonerate them of all misdeeds — his monograph on post-War history of Poland portrayed the Kielce pogrom as a handiwork of Communist agents, rather than Poles, despite lack of supportive evidence.

In December 2023, Roszkowski was given the "Patriot of the Year" (Polish: Patriota Roku) award during the Patriot Day IX (Polish: IX Dzień Patrioty) event. Both the event and the award are organised in part by the same Biały Kruk publishers that have published several of Roszkowski's books.

=== Historia i teraźniejszość textbooks ===
In August 2022, the Polish Ministry of Education and Science authorised Roszkowski's 1945–1979. Historia i teraźniejszość (1945–1979. History and the Present) textbook for use by liceum and technikum schools when teaching a newly introduced subject of the same name. At the time of its publication, the textbook aroused controversy, with accusations including stigmatization of children born through in vitro fertilization, equating feminism with Nazism, and an essayistic, persuasive form of communication.

== Bibliography ==
- Najnowsza historia Polski 1914–2002 (Newest History of Poland 1914–2002), 2003, ISBN 83-7311-991-4.
- Historia Polski 1945–2005 (History of Poland 1945–2005), Wydawnictwo Naukowe PWN, 2006, ISBN 978-83-01-14696-2.
- Droga przez mgłę (Walking through the fog), Instytut Jagielloński, 2006, ISBN 978-83-60559-00-0.
- Świat Chrystusa (The world of Christ), Wydawnictwo Biały Kruk, 2016, ISBN 978-83-7553-218-0.
- Mistrzowska gra Józefa Piłsudskiego (Józef Piłsudski's Mastergame), Wydawnictwo Biały Kruk, 2018, ISBN 978-83-7553-240-1.
- Roztrzaskane Lustro – Upadek cywilizacji zachodniej (The Shattered Mirror – The Downfall of the Western Civilization), Wydawnictwo Biały Kruk, 2019, ISBN 978-83-7553-260-9.
- Orlęta Lwowskie (Lwów Eaglets), Wydawnictwo Biały Kruk, 2019.
- Kierunek Targowica. Polska 2005–2015 (Heading to Targowica. Poland 2005–2015), Wydawnictwo Biały Kruk, 2019.
- 1945–1979. Historia i teraźniejszość (1945–1979. History and the Present), Wydawnictwo Biały Kruk, 2022. ISBN 978-83-7553-347-7 Ministry of Education and Science ref. no. 1145/1/2022
- 1980-2015. Historia i teraźniejszość (1980-2015. History and the Present), Wydawnictwo Biały Kruk, 2023. ISBN 978-83-7553-370-5 Ministry of Education and Science ref. no. 1145/2/2023

== See also ==
- 2004 European Parliament election in Poland
