= Stanley Julian Roszkowski =

American judge

Senior Judge of the United States District Court for the Northern District of Illinois
- In office January 9, 1991 – January 31, 1998

Judge of the United States District Court for the Northern District of Illinois
- In office October 11, 1977 – January 9, 1991
- Appointed by: Jimmy Carter
- Preceded by: Richard Wellington McLaren
- Succeeded by: Wayne Andersen

Personal details
- Born: Stanley Julian Roszkowski; January 27, 1923 Boonville, New York
- Died: July 7, 2014 (aged 91) Rockford, Illinois
- Education: University of Illinois at Urbana–Champaign (BS); University of Illinois College of Law (JD)

Stanley Julian Roszkowski (January 27, 1923 – July 7, 2014) was a United States district judge of the United States District Court for the Northern District of Illinois.

== Education and career ==
Born in Boonville, New York, Roszkowski was a staff sergeant in the United States Army Air Forces during World War II, from 1943 to 1945. He received a Bachelor of Science degree from the University of Illinois at Urbana–Champaign in 1949 and a Juris Doctor from the University of Illinois College of Law in 1954. He was in private practice in Rockford, Illinois from 1955 to 1977.

== Federal judicial service ==
On July 19, 1977, Roszkowski was nominated by President Jimmy Carter to a seat on the United States District Court for the Northern District of Illinois vacated by Judge Richard Wellington McLaren. Roszkowski was confirmed by the United States Senate on October 7, 1977, and received his commission on October 11, 1977. He assumed senior status on January 9, 1991, serving in that capacity until his retirement, on January 31, 1998. The Stanley J. Roszkowski United States Courthouse in Rockford is named for him. He died in Rockford, on July 7, 2014.

== Sources ==
Legal offices
| Preceded by Richard Wellington McLaren | Judge of the United States District Court for the Northern District of Illinois; 1977–1991 | Succeeded by Wayne Andersen |
