= List of Polish baronial families =

This is a list of Polish noble families with the title of Baron.

== Families ==
#	Name	Coat of Arms	Title recognition	Remarks
1	Bertrand de Domballe	Bertrand	A 1828; K.P.	
2	Błażowski	Sas	G 1778, K.P.	
3	Bobowski	Gryf	G 1788	died out
4	Borowski	Jastrzębiec	A 1808	died out
5	Brunicki	Brunstein	Baw. 1815; A 1818, 1829, 1847	died out
6	Brunnow	Trzy belki		Polish line died out
7	Budwiński	Budwinski	A 1875	died out
8	Buxhoevden	Buxhoevden		Polish line died out
9	Bystram	Tarnawa	Szw. 1603; R 1834–1862	
10	Chaudoir	Chaudoir	Baw.?	
11	Chłapowski de Chłapowo	Dryja	F 1809; P ?	
12	Chłędowski von Pfaffenhoffen	Bończa	A 1884	
13	Chłopicki	Nieczuja	F 1810; K.P.	
14	Chłusowicz	Gozdawa	F 1813; K.P.	
15	Christiani-Grabienski-Kronauge von Kronwald	Grabieński-Kronauge	A 1868	
16	Czechowicz de Zarubienice	Ostoja	G 1783	
17	Czecz de Lindenwald	Czecz de Lindenwald	A 1898	
18	Dembowski	Jelita	F	
19	Doliniański	Abdank	G 1782	
20	Dulfus	Dolfus	K.P.	
21	Dulski	Przegienia	G 1782	
22	Fodzielski	Fodzielski(?)	F	
23	Frenkel	Frenkel	R	
24	Goetz-Okocimski	Goetz-Okocimski	A 1908	
25	Gostkowski	Gozdawa	G 1782	
26	Grotthuss vel Grothus	Grotthuss	R 1844, 1862, 1863	
27	Guzkowski	Lubicz odm.	A 1918	
29	Hadziewicz	Wieniawa	G 1780	
30	Harsdorf v. Enderndorf	Harsdorf	Baw. 1841	
31	Heinzel v. Hohenfels	Heinzel v. Hohenfels	S 1891	
32	Heydel	Haydel	A 1826; K.P.	
33	Holstinghausen Holsten	Holstinghausen Holsten	R 1853, 1862	
34	Horoch	Trąby	G 1791; R 1844; K.P.	
35	Jachimowicz	Pelikan	A 1854	
36	Jakubowski	Oksza	A 1808	
37	Jaworski	Sas	G 1779	
38	Jarzmanowski	Dołęga	F 1813, K.P.	
40	Karnicki	Lis	G 1782	
41	Kasinowski	Nałęcz	F 1810	
42	Kelles-Krauz	Kelles-Krauz	Rz.O.1569/1572; R 1857	
43	Klicki	Prus	F 1811	
44	Kobyliński	Łodzia	F 1809; K.P.	
45	Kochanowski de Stawczany	Kochanowski	A 1898	
46	Konopka	Nowina	G 1791	
47	Kosiński	Rogala	F 1812; R 1836, 1858; K.P.	
48	Kozietulski	Abdank	F 1810	
49	Kronenberg	Strugi	R 1898	
50	Krukowiecki	Pomian	G 1784	
51	Kruszewski	Abdank(?)	F 1813	
52	Larisch	Larisch	P 1786	
53	Lenval	Leneval	S 1881, 1884	
54	Lesser	Lesser	S 1876 i 1877, R 1876, P 1877, B 1877	
55	Lewartowski	Lewart	G 1783; K.P.	
56	Lipowski	Lipowski	G 1827	
57	Lazonowski	Krzywda	F 1809	
58	Łubieński	Pomian	F 1810	
59	Maltzahn	Maltzahn		Polish line died out
60	Manteuffel-Szoege	Manteuffel-Szoege	R 1853	
62	Michałowski	Jasieńczyk	F 1812	
63	Miłoszewicz	Łabędź	F 1809	
64	Moysa-Rosochacki	Moysa-Rosochacki	A 1910	
65	Niemyski	Jastrzębiec	G 1783	
66	Offenberg	Offenberg	R	
67	Osten-Sacken	Osten-Sacken	R	
68	Otocki	Dołęga	G 1784	
70	Przychocki	Trzaska	G 1794	
71	du Puget-Puszet	Puget	Rz.O. 1721; R 1854, 1861; K.P.	
72	Rahden	Rahden		
73	Radoszewski	Oksza	S 1870	
74	Rastawiecki	Sas	G 1781; R 1844; K.P.	
75	Reisky de Dubnitz	Reisky de Dubnitz	R 1857; K.P.	
76	Roenne	Roenne		Polish line died out
77	Rohn v. Rohnau	Rohn	A 1860	
78	Romaszek	Romaszkan	A 1856, 1857	
79	Ropp	Ropp	R ?	Polish male line died out
81	Skarzyński	Bończa	F 1814; P 1841; K.P.	
83	Soldenhoff	Soldenhoff	K.P.	
84	Stokowski	Jelita	F 1810	
85	Szarski-Roża	Budowinski	A 1918	
86	Taube	Taube	Rz.O. 1572; Szw. 1680; R 1862	Polish line
87	Ungern-Sternberg	Ungern-Sternberg		
88	Unruh	Unruh	P 1903	
89	Wattmann-Maelcamp-Beaulieu	Wattmann-Maelcamp-Beaulieu	A 1849	
90	Warenko	Łagoda	G 1783	
91	Wielowieyski	Półkozic	A 1825	
92	Wyszyński	Trzywdar	G 1782; R 1844, 1852; K.P.	
93	Zachert	Runicki	R 1870	
94	Załuski	Junosza	F 1813	
95	Zawadzki	Rogala	Hol. 1816	
96	Ziemiałkowski	Ziemiałkowski		
95	Ziemiecki	Nieczuja	A 1874	

== Abbreviations explanation ==
Abbreviations
A – Habsburg monarchy / Austrian Empire
B – Belgium
C – Courland
Cz. – Bohemia
Baw. – Bavaria
F – France
G – Kingdom of Galicia and Lodomeria
H – Netherlands
K.P. – Kingdom of Poland (1815–1918)
P – Prussia
Rz.O. – Polish–Lithuanian Commonwealth
R – Russia
S – Saxony
Szw. – Sweden

== See also ==
- List of szlachta
- List of Polish titled nobility
- Magnates of Poland and Lithuania

== Bibliography ==
- Szymon Konarski, Armorial de la noblesse titrèe polonaise, Paris 1958, s. 365-399.
- Tomasz Lenczewski, Genealogie rodów utytułowanych w Polsce, t. I, Warszawa 1997.
- Der Adel von Galizien, Lodomerien und der Bukowina. J. Siebmacher's großes Wappenbuch, Band 32, Nürnberg 1905, s. 101-111.
