= Simulated growth of plants =

The simulated growth of plants is a significant task in of systems biology and mathematical biology, which seeks to reproduce plant morphology with computer software. Electronic trees (e-trees) usually use L-systems to simulate growth. L-systems are very important in the field of complexity science and A-life. A universally accepted system for describing changes in plant morphology at the cellular or modular level has yet to be devised. The most widely implemented tree-generating algorithms are described in the papers "Creation and Rendering of Realistic Trees", and Real-Time Tree Rendering

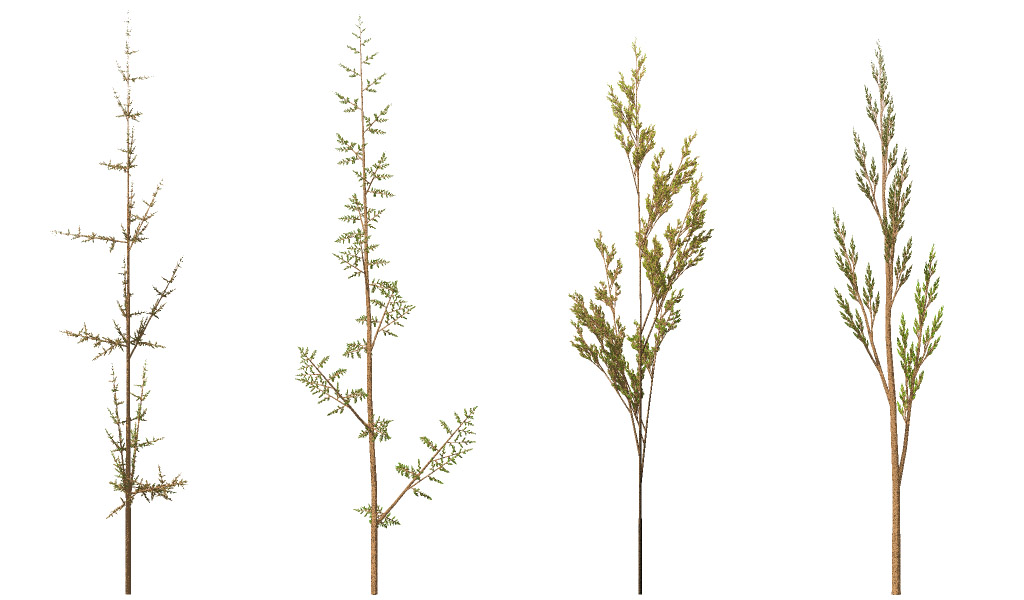
'Weeds', generated using an L-system in 3D.

The realistic modeling of plant growth is of high value to biology, but also for computer games.

== Theory + Algorithms ==
A biologist, Aristid Lindenmayer (1925–1989) worked with yeast and filamentous fungi and studied the growth patterns of various types of algae, such as the blue/green bacteria Anabaena catenula. Originally the L-systems were devised to provide a formal description of the development of such simple multicellular organisms, and to illustrate the neighbourhood relationships between plant cells. Later on, this system was extended to describe higher plants and complex branching structures. Central to L-systems, is the notion of rewriting, where the basic idea is to define complex objects by successively replacing parts of a simple object using a set of rewriting rules or productions. The rewriting can be carried out recursively. L-Systems are also closely related to Koch curves.

A Fractal plant

=== Environmental interaction ===
A challenge for plant simulations is to consistently integrate environmental factors, such as surrounding plants, obstructions, water and mineral availability, and lighting conditions. Essentially, attempting to build virtual environments with as many parameters as computationally feasible, thereby, not only simulating the growth of the plant, but also the environment it is growing within, and, in fact, whole ecosystems. Changes in resource availability influence plant growth, which in turn results in a change of resource availability. Powerful models and powerful hardware will be necessary to effectively simulate these recursive interactions of recursive structures.

== Software ==
- OpenAlea: an open-source software environment for plant modeling, which contains L-Py, an open-source python implementation of the Lindenmayer systems
- Branching: L-system Tree A Java applet and its source code (open source) of the botanical tree growth simulation using the L-system.
- Arbaro- opensource
- Treal- opensource
- L-arbor
- Genesis 3.0
- AmapSim - from Cirad
- GreenLab
- ONETREE -Accompanying the CDROM is a CO_{2} meter that plugs into a local serial port. It is this that controls the growth rate of the trees. It is the actual carbon dioxide level right at the computer that controls the growth rate of these virtual trees.
- Powerplant

see Comparison of tree generators and A Survey of Modeling and Rendering Trees

== See also ==
- modelling biological systems
- The Algorithmic Beauty of Plants
