= Lake Roś =

Lake in Poland

- Jezioro Roś (Polish)
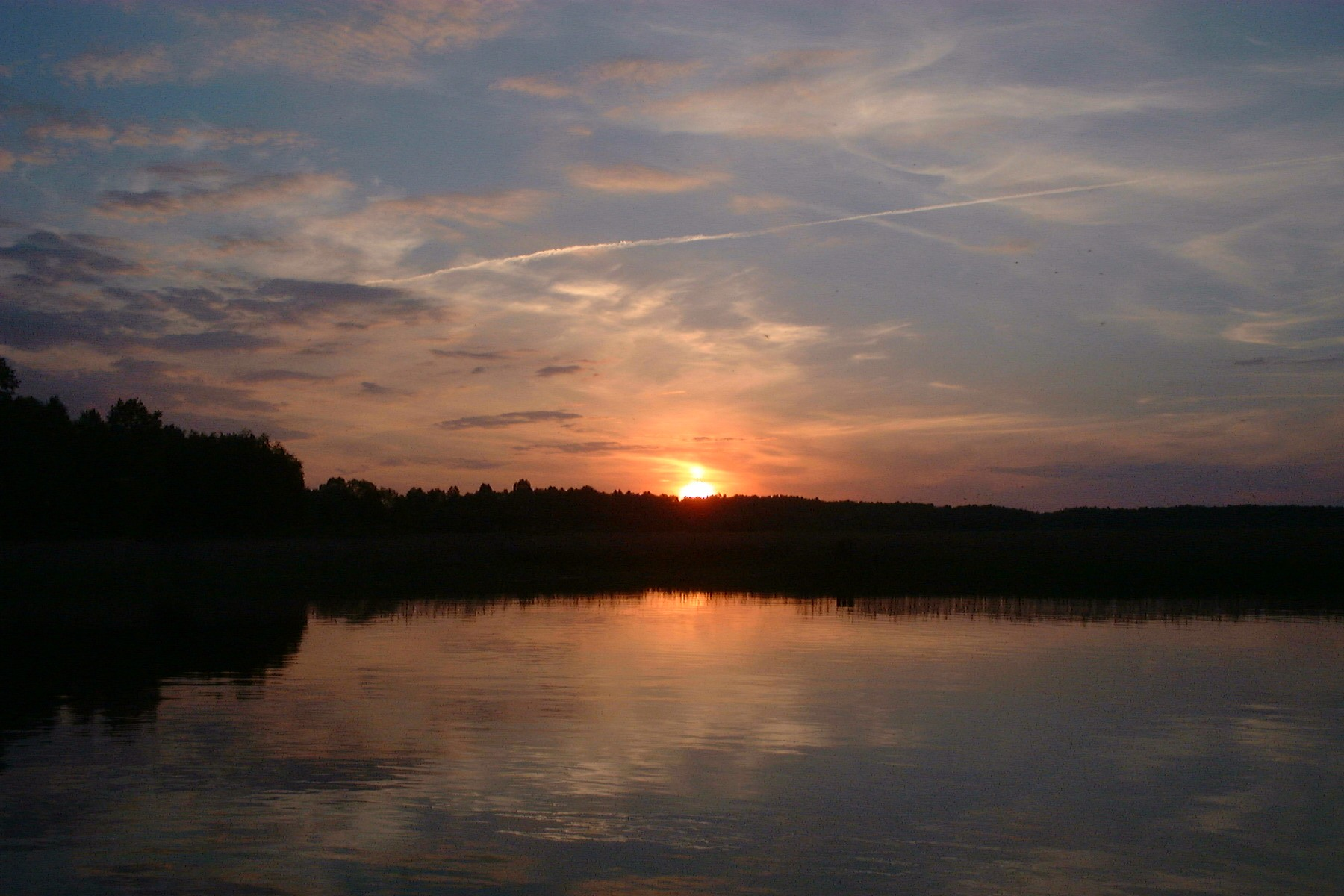
- sunset

- Location within Warmian-Masurian Voivodeship
- Location: Masurian Lake District, Poland
- Coordinates: 53°40′1″N 21°53′36″E
- Primary inflows: Swięcek and Konopka
- Primary outflows: Pisa
- Basin countries: Poland
- Surface area: 18.88 km^{2} (7.29 sq mi)
- Average depth: 8.1 m (27 ft) (mean)
- Max. depth: 31.8 m (104 ft)
- Water volume: 152.9×10^{6} m^{3} (5.40×10^{9} cu ft)
- Shore length^{1}: 51.6 km (32.1 mi)
- Surface elevation: 115.4 m (379 ft)
- Frozen: For period 1977–1992 usually between 21 December and 15 March with maximum ice thickness 32 cm (13 in)
- ^{1} Shore length is not a well-defined measure.

Lake Roś (Polish: Jezioro Roś, German: Roschsee) is a lake in the Masurian Lake District of the Warmian-Masurian Voivodeship of Poland. The S-shaped glacial lake has an area of 18.88 km^{2} (7.29 sq mi) and a maximum depth of 31.8 metres (104 feet). The Swięcek and Konopka rivers flow into the lake, while the Pisa River flows out of it. The largest town on the lake is Pisz.
