= Paul Kruszewski =

Canadian AI technologist and serial entrepreneur

- Born: 1967 (age 58–59); Alberta, Canada
- Education: McGill University
- Occupations: Founder and CEO of QARL

Paul Kruszewski (born 1967) is a Canadian AI technologist and serial entrepreneur known for his work in artificial intelligence and computer graphics. He has previously founded and sold three AI startups, specializing in crowd simulation, NPC behaviours, and human pose estimation.

== Academic life ==
Kruszewski obtained a BSc in computer science from University of Alberta and an MSc and PhD in computer science from McGill University. For graduate school, Kruszewski received a Natural Sciences and Engineering Research Council of Canada (NSERC) Science and Engineering scholarship in 1992. His PhD thesis on random binary trees suggested a method to produce realistic images of trees digitally. His work was inspired by The Algorithmic Beauty of Plants by Przemysław Prusinkiewicz. After completing his thesis, Kruszewski developed and commercialized the software, naming it the "Tree Druid."

== Professional life ==
Earlier in his career, he founded BioGraphic Technologies and Grip/Grip Entertainment, developing crowd simulation, NPC behavior systems, and AI tools used in major games and visual-effects pipelines. Across three decades, Kruszewski has built a technical portfolio spanning digital humans, motion understanding, embodied AI, real-time simulation, spatial computing, and interactive systems, supported by peer-reviewed publications, patents, and ongoing involvement in AI ecosystems such as NVIDIA GTC, CVPR, and Creative Destruction Lab.

=== Work in industry ===
After obtaining his PhD, Kruszewski held various positions within the AI/computer graphics ecosystem in Montreal.

During this time he developed the first cloud-based human simulator at My Virtual Model. As CTO, he led development of a multiplatform PS2 and Xbox game engine at Behaviour Interactive.

=== Entrepreneurial initiatives ===
==== BioGraphic Technologies Inc. ====
Kruszewski founded BioGraphic Technologies (BGT) in 2000. BGT is best known for developing "AI.implant", a crowd simulation program. Working from his previous experience in video game development, Kruszewski focused BGT's vision on the film and gaming industries, collaborating with such companies as Lucasfilm, Disney and Sony Computer Entertainment. Engenuity Technologies, now Presagis, a modeling and simulation software provider, saw the benefits of simulating large civilian crowds for training purposes, purchasing the company in 2005. Kruszewski became the CTO of Engenuity.

==== GripHeavyIndustries ====
In July 2007, Kruszewski founded GripHeavyIndustries, better known as Grip Entertainment, which created complex AI characters for a range of game developers, such as EA, Disney, and BioWare. The company is credited on such titles as Army of Two: The 40th Day and Deus Ex: Human Revolution.

In 2011, the company experienced some controversy when gamers rallied against Grip's boss fights at the end of the game Deus Ex: Human Revolution. Eidos Montreal had outsourced the development of the game's boss fights to Grip due to time constraints and the complex nature of the open-ended gameplay. Players felt that the fights were inflexible when compared with the rest of the game, causing a stir in the industry. Later, Eidos pubically apologized and explained that Grip was not responsible for the That same year, Autodesk, a multinational software company, acquired Grip Entertainment.

==== wrnch ====
Kruszewski's third venture built on previous experience gained from working with computer vision technology. He founded wrnch in April 2014 in Montreal's TandemLaunch incubator. Initially, wrnch was developing a video denoising technology but quickly pivoted into deep learning based computer vision.

Through wrnch, he developed BodySLAM, a deep learning AI body-tracking software. As a man-machine interface, BodySLAM had many possible applications in various industries, such as health care, security, retail and entertainment. On Sept. 17, 2021, it was announced that Hinge Health, the world’s #1 Digital Musculoskeletal Clinic™, had acquired wrnch. After the acquisition, Kruszewski served as Hinge Health's VP of Deep Technology for 2 years, where he oversaw the integration of the wrnch virtual motion capture into Hinge Health's suite of offerings.

==== QARL ====
In 2024, Kruszewski founded QARL, his latest venture building at the intersection of deep tech, AI and human-machine interaction.

== Views ==
Kruszewski advocates for human-centered AI, emphasizing systems that interpret and collaborate with human movement rather than replace human expertise. His long-term vision focuses on natural, embodied interaction between people and intelligent systems, a philosophy reflected in his work on motion capture, simulation, and therapeutic AI tools.

He frequently highlights the importance of deep-tech entrepreneurship, valuing perseverance, creativity, curiosity, and applied research as the foundation for building world-class teams. Influences he cites include Turing, Kurzweil, Edison, and Mozart—reflecting a worldview that spans science, engineering, and creativity.

His personal interests include video games, generative 3D art, and long-term technological shifts in AI, AR, and virtual environments. He describes his professional alignment as “chaotic good,” emphasizing innovation driven by impact and exploration.

== Publications and patents ==
=== Publications ===
- The Botanical Beauty of Random Binary Trees, (1995)
- On the Horton-Strahler Number for Random Tries, (1996)
- An algorithm for sculpting trees, (1999)
- A probabilistic technique for the synthetic imagery of lightning, (1999)
- A Note on the Horton-Strahler Number for Random Binary Search Trees, (1999)
- Crowd Modeling For Military Simulations Using Game Technology, (2005)
- Believable and Reactive Crowds in Next Generation Games, (2006)
- Navigation Challenges in Massively Destructible Worlds (2007)
- Integrating Crowd-Behavior Modeling into Military Simulation using Game Technology, (2008)
- Engineering Fun, (2011)

=== Patents ===
- Method and Stem for On-Screen Animation of Digital Objects or Characters, (2004)
- System and Method for Displaying Selected Garments on a Computer-Simulated Mannequin, (1999, 2009, 2011, 2012)
