= Kosinsky =

Kosinsky (masculine), Kosinskaya (feminine), or Kosinskoye (neuter) may refer to:

- Kosinsky (rural locality) (Kosinskaya, Kosinskoye), name of several rural localities in Russia
- Kosinsky District, a district of Perm Krai, Russia
- Kosinskoye, Vladimir Oblast, Selivanovsky District, Vladimir Oblast, Russia
- Vladimir Kosinsky (1945–2011), Soviet swimmer

== See also ==
- Kosinski (disambiguation)
