= Michael Cronin (academic) =

Irish academic

- Born: 1 October 1960 (age 66)

Academic background
- Thesis: Ludic elements in the prose fiction of Réjean Ducharme and Gérard Bessette (1991)

Academic work
- Discipline: Translation studies
- Institutions: Trinity College Dublin, Ireland

Michael Anthony Cronin (born 1 October 1960) is an Irish academic specialist in culture, travel literature, translation studies and the Irish language. He is the current holder of the Chair of French (established 1776) at Trinity College Dublin, Ireland. Cronin is a member of the Royal Irish Academy.

== Biography ==
He was born on 1 October 1960 holds a BA in French and English from Trinity College Dublin in 1982, a MA from University College Dublin and a Ph.D. awarded in 1991 from Trinity College Dublin with a thesis "Ludic elements in the prose fiction of Réjean Ducharme and Gérard Bessette"

He is co-editor of The Irish Review.

He was elected a member of the Royal Irish Academy in 2008, and held the post of its Humanities Secretary.

He was also the Chairperson of Poetry Ireland.

He was appointed to the Ambassadors Chair at KU Leuven for the 2019-2020 academic year.

== Published works ==
Books written by Michael Cronin include:

- Eco-Travel: Journeying in the Age of the Anthropocene. Cambridge: Cambridge University Press, 2022. ISBN 9781108913904
- Irish and Ecology / An Ghaeilge agus an Éiceolaíocht. Dublin: Foilseacháin Ábhair Spioradálta, 2019. ISBN 9781906982669
- Eco-Translation: Translation and Ecology in the Age of the Anthropocene. Milton Park, Abingdon, Oxon: Routledge, 2017. ISBN 9781138916838
- Translation in the Digital Age. Milton Park, Abingdon, Oxon: Routledge, 2013. ISBN 9780415608596
  - Arabic translation published as الترجمة في العصر الرقمي ISBN 9786038197509 Translated by Dr. Mubarak Alkhatnai of King Saud University, Riyadh, Saudi Arabia
  - Polish translation published as Przekład w epoce cyfrowej, translated by Marta Błaszkowska, Magda Heydel, Elżbieta Koziołkiewicz, Maciej Nawrocki, Aldona Pikul, Zofia Ziemann, Kraków: Wydawnictwo Uniwersytetu Jagiellońskiego, 2016
- Translation Goes to the Movies. New York, NY: Routledge, 2009. ISBN 9780415422857
- Translation and Identity. London: Routledge, 2006 ISBN 9780203015698
- Irish in the New Century. Dublin: Cois Life, 2005
- Translation and Globalization, Routledge, 2003. ISBN 9780415270656 According to WorldCat, the book is held in 281 libraries
  - Arabic translation published as الترجمة والعولمة / al-Tarjamah wa-al-ʻawlamah ISBN 9789992182512
  - Japanese translation published as 翻訳とグローバリゼーション : 新翻訳事始め / Hon'yaku to gurōbarizēshon : Shin hon'yaku kotohajime ISBN 9784271115045
- (with Barbara O'Connor) Irish Tourism: Image, Culture and Identity, Channel View Publications, 2003. ISBN 9781873150559 According to WorldCat, the book is held in 591 libraries
- Time Tracks: Scenes from the Irish Everyday, New Island, 2003.
- Irish Tourism: Image, Culture and Identity, Cork University Press, 2002.
- (with Cormac Ó Cuilleanáin) The Languages of Ireland, Four Courts Press, 2002.
- Translating Tomorrow: Translation, Technology and Interculturality in a Global Age], Routledge, 2002.
- Across the Lines: Travel, Language, Translation, Cork University Press, 2000.
- Unity in Diversity? Current Trends in Translation Studies, St Jerome Press, 1998.
- Anthologie des nouvelles irlandaises, L'Instant meme, 1997.
- Translating Ireland: Translation, Languages and Identity, Cork University Press, 1996.
- Tourism in Ireland: A Critical Analysis, Cork University Press, 1993.

Books edited by him include:

- The Languages of Ireland, Four Courts Press, 2003. ISBN 9781851826988
- Reinventing Ireland: Culture, Society and the Global Economy, Pluto Press, 2002. ISBN 9781849641272
