= Kosinski (disambiguation) =

Kosiński is a Polish surname.

Kosinski may also refer to:

- Kosinski, a recurring Star Trek: The Next Generation character who premiered in "Where No One Has Gone Before"
- "Kosinski", a song by Angels of Light from the album Everything Is Good Here/Please Come Home

== See also ==
- Kosinsky (disambiguation)
