= Kosinsky (rural locality) =

Kosinsky (Russian: Косинский; masculine), Kosinskaya (Косинская; feminine), or Kosinskoye (Косинское; neuter) is the name of several rural localities in Russia:

- Kosinskoye, Kostroma Oblast, a village in Buysky District of Kostroma Oblast
- Kosinskoye, Vladimir Oblast, a selo in Yuryev-Polsky District of Vladimir Oblast
