= Inside–outside algorithm =

Parameter estimation method for probabilistic context-free grammars

For parsing algorithms in computer science, the inside–outside algorithm is a way of re-estimating production probabilities in a probabilistic context-free grammar. It was introduced by James K. Baker in 1979 as a generalization of the forward–backward algorithm for parameter estimation on hidden Markov models to stochastic context-free grammars. It is used to compute expectations, for example as part of the expectation–maximization algorithm (an unsupervised learning algorithm).

== Inside and outside probabilities ==
The inside probability $\beta_j(p,q)$ is the total probability of generating words $w_p \cdots w_q$, given the root nonterminal $N^j$ and a grammar $G$:

$$\beta_j(p,q) = P(w_{pq}|N^j_{pq}, G)$$

The outside probability $\alpha_j(p,q)$ is the total probability of beginning with the start symbol $N^1$ and generating the nonterminal $N^j_{pq}$ and all the words outside $w_p \cdots w_q$, given a grammar $G$:

$$\alpha_j(p,q) = P(w_{1(p-1)}, N^j_{pq}, w_{(q+1)m}|G)$$

== Computing inside probabilities ==
Base Case:

$\beta_j(p,p) = P(w_{p}|N^j, G)$

General case:

Suppose there is a rule $N_j \rightarrow N_r N_s$ in the grammar, then the probability of generating $w_p \cdots w_q$ starting with a subtree rooted at $N_j$ is:

$\sum_{k=p}^{k=q-1} P(N_j \rightarrow N_r N_s)\beta_r(p,k) \beta_s(k+1,q)$

The inside probability $\beta_j(p,q)$ is just the sum over all such possible rules:

$\beta_j(p,q) = \sum_{N_r,N_s} \sum_{k=p}^{k=q-1} P(N_j \rightarrow N_r N_s)\beta_r(p,k) \beta_s(k+1,q)$

== Computing outside probabilities ==
Base Case:

$$\alpha_j(1,n) = \begin{cases}
1 & \mbox{if } j=1 \\
0 & \mbox{otherwise}
\end{cases}$$

Here the start symbol is $N_1$.

General case:

Suppose there is a rule $N_r \rightarrow N_j N_s$ in the grammar that generates $N_j$. Then the left contribution of that rule to the outside probability $\alpha_j(p,q)$ is:

$\sum_{k=q+1}^{k=n} P(N_r \rightarrow N_j N_s)\alpha_r(p,k) \beta_s(q+1,k)$

Now suppose there is a rule $N_r \rightarrow N_s N_j$ in the grammar. Then the right contribution of that rule to the outside probability $\alpha_j(p,q)$ is:

$\sum_{k=1}^{k=p-1} P(N_r \rightarrow N_s N_j)\alpha_r(k,q) \beta_s(k,p-1)$

The outside probability $\alpha_j(p,q)$ is the sum of the left and right contributions over all such rules:

$\alpha_j(p,q) = \sum_{N_r,N_s} \sum_{k=q+1}^{k=n} P(N_r \rightarrow N_j N_s)\alpha_r(p,k) \beta_s(q+1,k) + \sum_{N_r,N_s} \sum_{k=1}^{k=p-1} P(N_r \rightarrow N_s N_j)\alpha_r(k,q) \beta_s(k,p-1)$
