= Data-oriented parsing =

Data-oriented parsing (DOP, also data-oriented processing) is a probabilistic model in computational linguistics. DOP was conceived by Remko Scha in 1990 with the aim of developing a performance-oriented grammar framework. Unlike other probabilistic models, DOP takes into account all subtrees contained in a treebank rather than being restricted to, for example, 2-level subtrees (like PCFGs), thus allowing for more context-sensitive information.

Several variants of DOP have been developed. The initial version developed by Rens Bod in 1992 was based on tree-substitution grammar, while more recently, DOP has been combined with lexical-functional grammar (LFG). The resulting DOP-LFG finds an application in machine translation. Other work on learning and parameter estimation for DOP has also found its way into machine translation.
