= Huis ter Heide, Utrecht =

Huis ter Heide
- Village
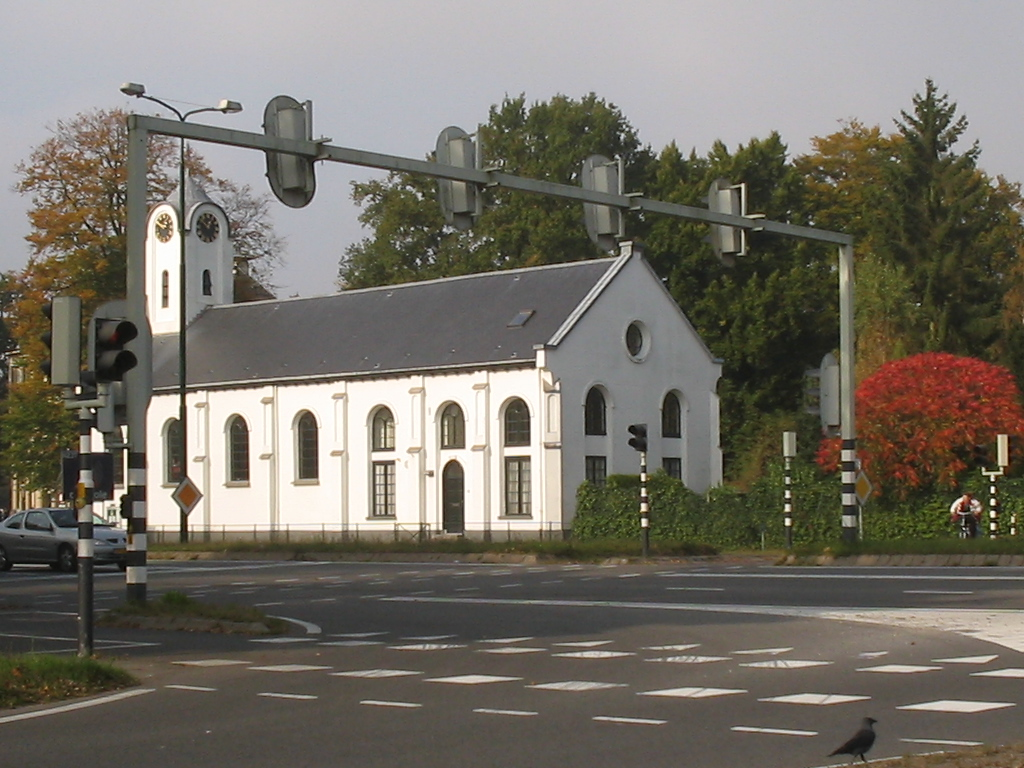
- A chapel in Huis ter Heide

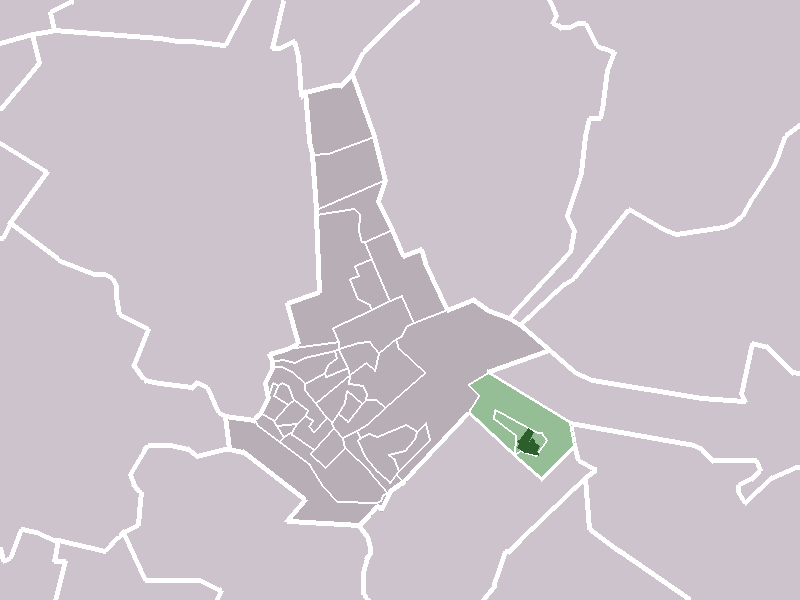

- Location in the Netherlands Huis ter Heide (Netherlands)
- Coordinates: 52°6′39″N 5°15′23″E
- Country: Netherlands
- Province: Utrecht
- Municipality: Zeist

Area
  - Total: 1.73 km^{2} (0.67 sq mi)
- Elevation: 9 m (30 ft)

Population (2021)
  - Total: 1,285
  - Density: 743/km^{2} (1,920/sq mi)
- Time zone: UTC+1 (CET)
  - Summer (DST): UTC+2 (CEST)
- Postal code: 3712
- Dialing code: 030
- Major roads: N237, N238

Huis ter Heide is a village in the central Netherlands. It is located in the municipality of Zeist, Utrecht, about 2 km northeast of the centre of the town Zeist.

== History ==
The village was first mentioned in 1681 as 't Huys ter Heyde, and means "house on the heath" which is a reference to an inn. Between 1652 and 1653, the main road from Utrecht to Amersfoort was built, and estates and villas were constructed along the road. The Dutch Reformed Church was built between 1858 and 1859 Between 1901 and 1941, there was railway stop in the village. The first McDonald's Drive-in restaurant in the Netherlands is located in Huis ter Heide.

== Notable people ==
- Aristid Lindenmayer (1925–1989), Hungarian biologist, died in Huis ter Heide.

== Gallery ==
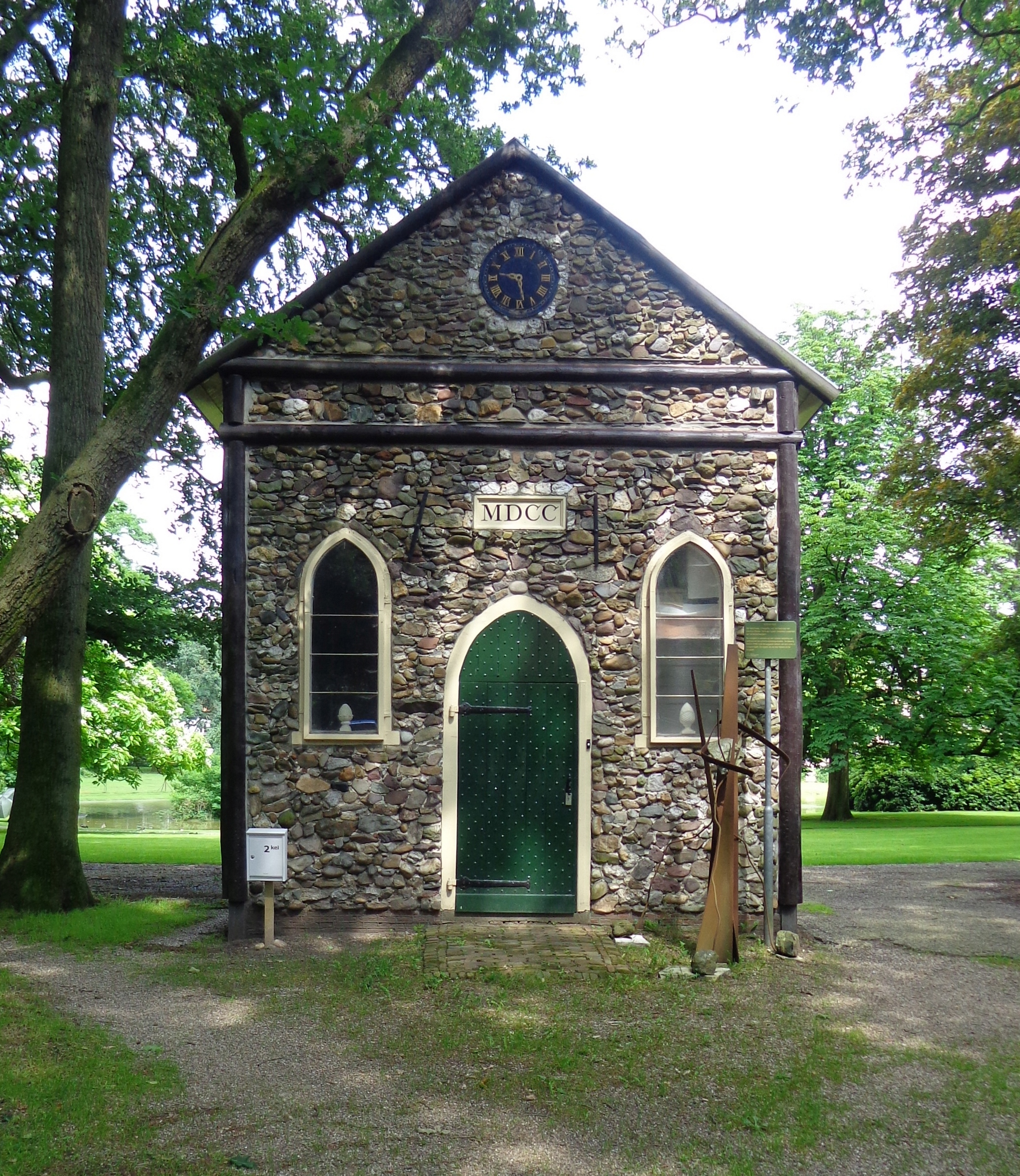
Tea house

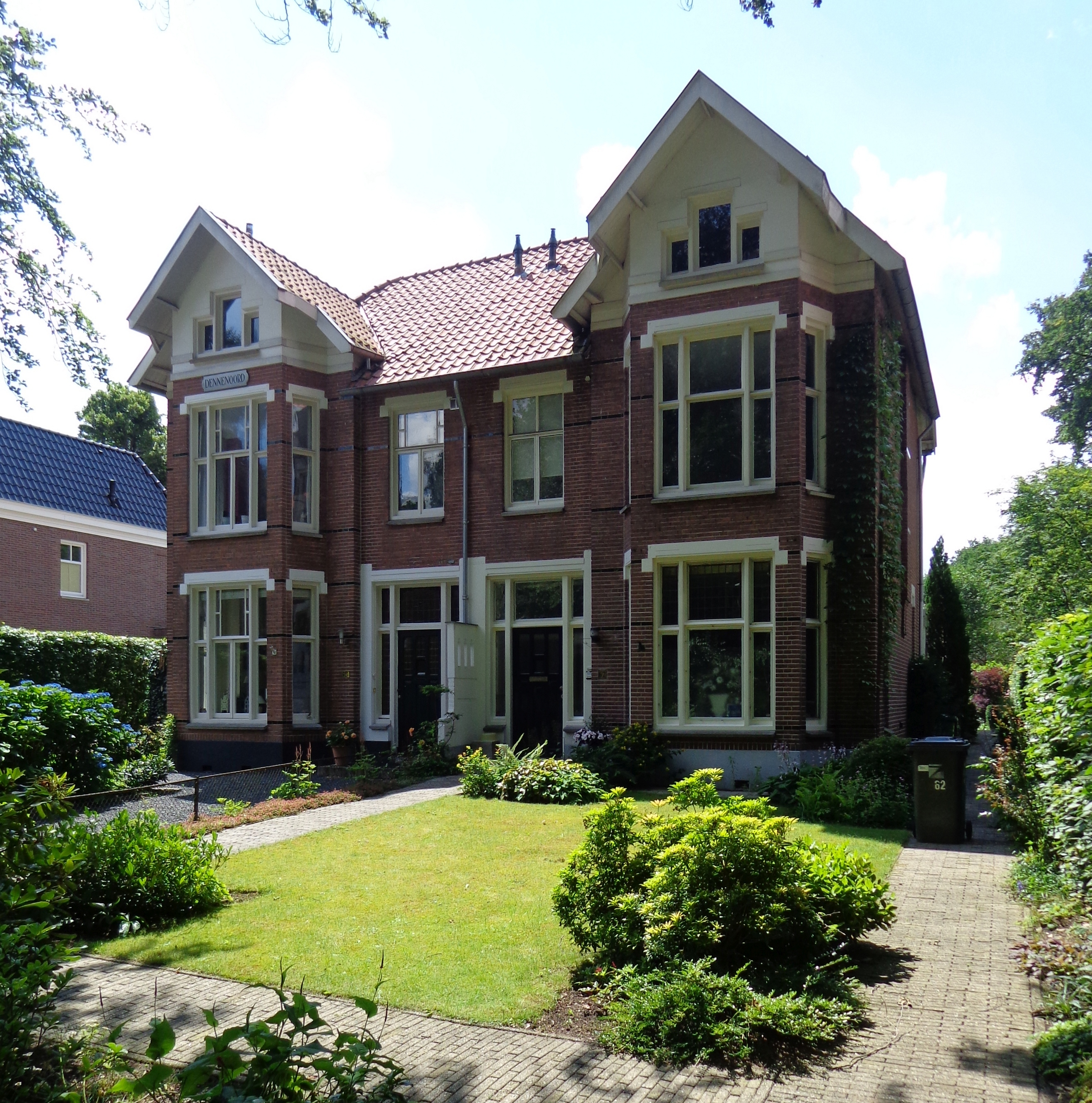
Village in Huis ter Heide

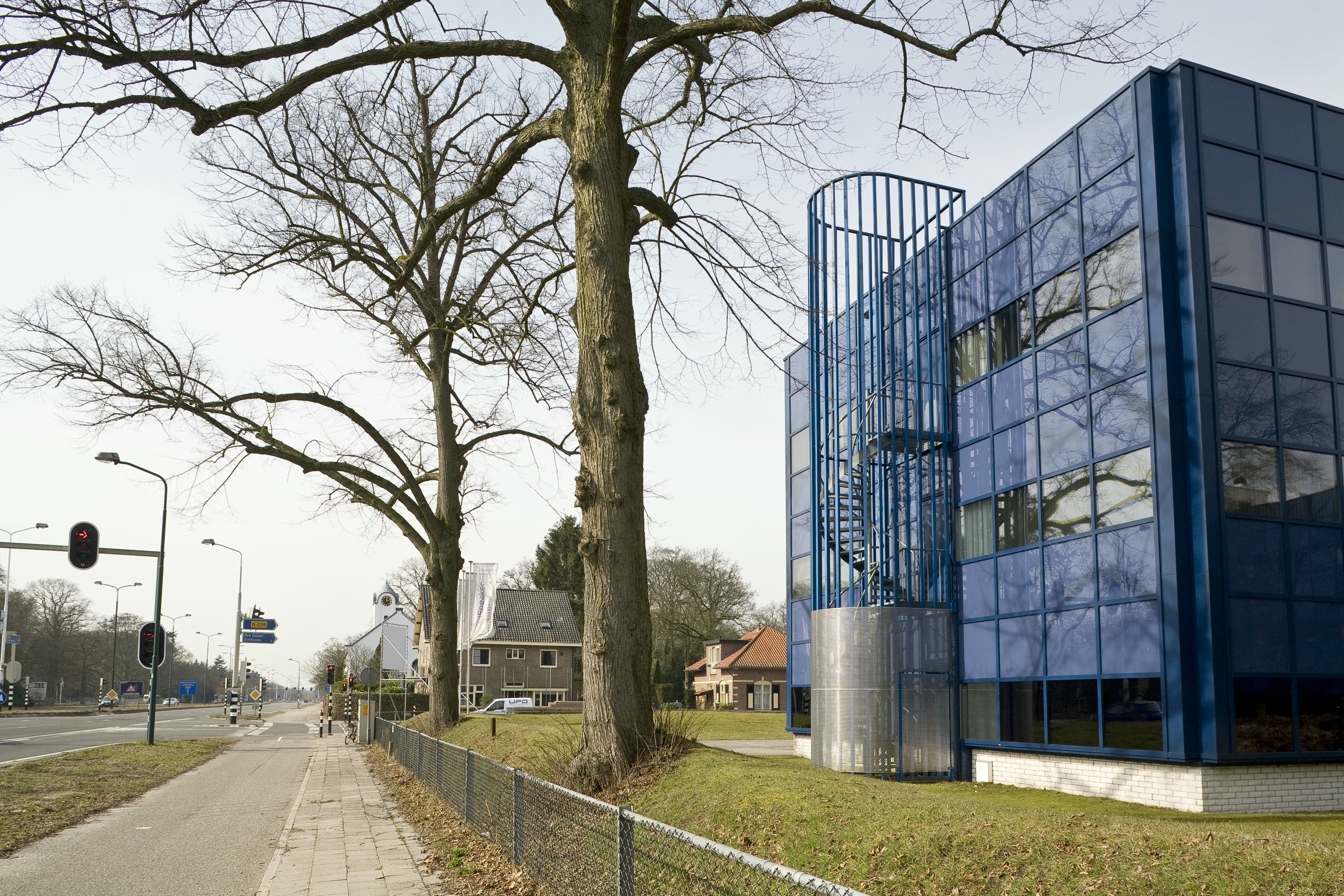
Office building
