= Heydel =

Heydel is a surname of German origin. Notable people with the surname include:

- Paul Heydel (1854-1935), German painter, portrait painter, and illustrator
- Karl Rudolf Heydel (1911-1936), German racing driver
- Magdalena Heydel (born 1969), Polish philologist and translator
