= The Algorithmic Beauty of Plants =

Book by Przemyslaw Prusinkiewicz and Aristid Lindenmayer

The Algorithmic Beauty of Plants is a 1990 book by Przemyslaw Prusinkiewicz and Aristid Lindenmayer. It is notable as it is the first comprehensive volume on the computer simulation of certain patterns in nature found in plant development (L-systems).

The book is no longer in print but is available free online.

== Contents ==
The book has eight chapters:

- Chapter 1 – Graphical modeling using L-systems
- Chapter 2 – Modeling of trees
- Chapter 3 – Developmental models of herbaceous plants
- Chapter 4 – Phyllotaxis
- Chapter 5 – Models of plant organs
- Chapter 6 – Animation of plant development
- Chapter 7 – Modeling of cellular layers
- Chapter 8 – Fractal properties of plants

== Reception ==
George Klir, reviewing the book in the International Journal of General Systems, writes that "This book, full of beautiful pictures of plants of great variety, is a testimony of the genius of Aristid Lindenmayer, who invented in 1968 systems that are now named by him -- Lindenmayer systems or L-systems. It is also a testimony of the power of current computer technology. The pictures in the book are not photographs of real plants. They are all generated on the computer by relatively simple algorithms based upon the idea of L-systems." Klir goes on to explain the mathematics of L-systems, involving replacement of strings of symbols with further strings according to production rules, adding that "high computer power is essential since the generation of realistic forms requires tremendous numbers of replacements and the geometric interpretation of the generated strings requires a highly sophisticated computer graphics".

Adrian Bell, reviewing the book in New Phytologist, writes that it demands respect for three reasons, namely that it is the first book to explain the algorithms behind virtual plants, it "unashamedly" connects art and science, and is unusual in being a real book on a computer-based subject. Each chapter, writes Bell, is an introductory manual to the simulation of an aspect of plant form, resulting "eventually" in a 3D image of a plant architecture.

Peter Antonelli, reviewing the book in SIAM Review, writes that it presents a "beautifully designed 'coffee-table-book'" summary of Lindenmayer's school of thought, explaining how Algorithmic Language Theory, like Noam Chomsky's theory of grammar, can describe how repeated structural units can arrange themselves. Antonelli suggests that Goethe would have disapproved of having the barrier of mathematics between the observer and the observed.

Karl Niklas, reviewing the book in The Quarterly Review of Biology, writes that the book, intended for many different audiences, is "unequally successful" in reaching them. Niklas suggests that those who wonder about how graphic artists create "the magnificent cyber-floras that sway and grow so realistically in the movies", and those who admire plant symmetry will enjoy the book. He is more skeptical about its claim to serious science as the book "fails to educate its readers" about the challenge of understanding plant form in terms of developmental biology. Therefore he believes the book falls short, the dazzling beauty of fractals not proving their relevance to biology.

== Sources ==
- Prusinkiewicz, Przemyslaw; Lindenmayer, Aristid (1990). The Algorithmic Beauty of Plants. Springer-Verlag. pp. 101–107. ISBN 978-0-387-97297-8.
