= Kruszewski =

Kruszewski (feminine: Kruszewska; plural: Kruszewscy) is a Polish surname. Notable people with the surname include:

- Ignacy Kruszewski (1799–1879), Polish military leader
- Kenneth Kruszewski (born 1948), American politician
- Mikołaj Kruszewski (1851–1887), Polish linguist
- Paul Kruszewski (born 1967), Canadian AI researcher
- Ronald Kruszewski (born 1958), American business executive
- Stefan P. Kruszewski, American psychiatrist and whistleblower
