= List of Polish titled nobility =

The following list of titled nobility includes noble families of Poland. Note that this list is incomplete due to the partitions.

== Titled families ==
- List of Polish princerly families
- List of Polish marquesal families
- List of Polish comital families
- List of Polish baronial families

== Medieval magnates ==
- Clan of Bogoria
- Clan of Dunin
- Clan of Gryf
- Clan of Jelita
- Clan of Leliwa
- Clan of Jastrzębiec
- Clan of Odrowąż
- Clan of Ostoja
- Clan of Kur

== See also ==
- List of szlachta
- List of magnates
