= Dulski =

Dulski, feminine: Dulska is a Polish noble surname. Notable people with the surname include:

- Jan Dulski (1534–1590), Polish nobleman and statesman
- Jennifer Dulski, American businesswoman
- Maria Dulska (1934–2021), Polish politician, MP
- Thaddeus J. Dulski (1915–1988), American politician

== Fictional characters ==
- Dulski family in 1930 Polish play and film The Morality of Mrs. Dulska, also in more recent films Dulscy and Panie Dulskie
