= Kosiński =

Kosiński (feminine: Kosińska; plural: Kosińscy) is a Polish-language surname. In other variants: Kosinski, Kosinska, Koziński, Kozińska, Kozyński, Kozyńska, Koszinski, Kosinsky, Kosinsky, Kosynsky, Kosynskyi.

- Alex Kozinski (born 1950), American jurist and judge on the U.S. Court of Appeals
- Alexandra Kosinski (born 1989), American distance-runner
- Cezary Kosiński (born 1973), Polish actor
- Daniela Kosińska (born 2001), Polish footballer
- Dorothy Kosinski, American scholar of nineteenth and twentieth-century art
- Gerard Kosinski (born 1954), former Democratic member of the Pennsylvania House of Representatives
- Izidoro Kosinski (1932–2017), Roman Catholic bishop
- Janusz Kozinski, Canadian academic
- Jerzy Kosiński (1933–1991), Polish-American novelist
- Joseph Kosinski (born 1974), American television commercial and feature film director
- Karolina Kosińska (born 1986), Polish tennis player
- Krzysztof Kosiński (1545–1593), Cossack noble from the Podlachia region, Polish–Lithuanian Commonwealth
- Maurice Kozinsky
- Michal Kosinski, Computational Psychologist, Professor at Stanford University
- Michelle Kosinski (born 1974), Emmy award-winning American journalist
- Norbert A. Kosinski (1918–1978), American politician
- Michal Kosinski (born 1982), Polish Professor at Stanford University
- Richard Kosinski, keyboard player
- Ryszard Kosiński (1955–2010), Polish sprint canoer
- Waldemar Kosiński (born 1965), Polish weightlifter
- Witold Kosiński (1946–2014), Polish mathematician and computer scientist
- Volodymyr Kosynsky (1864–1938), economist
- Vladimir Kosinsky (1945–2011), Soviet swimmer

== See also ==
- Kosinsky (disambiguation)
