= Locally catenative sequence =

In mathematics, a locally catenative sequence is a sequence of words in which each word can be constructed as the concatenation of previous words in the sequence.

Formally, an infinite sequence of words w(n) is locally catenative if, for some positive integers k and i_{1},...i_{k}:

$$w(n)=w(n-i_1)w(n-i_2)\ldots w(n-i_k) \text{ for } n \ge \max\{i_1, \ldots, i_k\} \, .$$

Some authors use a slightly different definition in which encodings of previous words are allowed in the concatenation.

== Examples ==
The sequence of Fibonacci words S(n) is locally catenative because

$$S(n)=S(n-1)S(n-2) \text{ for } n \ge 2 \, .$$

The sequence of Thue–Morse words T(n) is not locally catenative by the first definition. However, it is locally catenative by the second definition because

$$T(n)=T(n-1)\mu(T(n-1)) \text{ for } n \ge 1 \, ,$$

where the encoding μ replaces 0 with 1 and 1 with 0.
