= Tarnawa coat of arms =

Polish coat of arms

Tarnawa
- Earliest mention: 15th century
- Families: Bistram, Boksicki, Boksycki, Borucki, Borycki, Boryczewski, Boxycki, Broniewski, Bąckiewicz, Bystram, Bystry, Diatełowicz, Duczolski, Gałęzowski, Gałązowski, Godowski, Gorzkowski, Gożkowski, Jagliński, Jagniński, Jamski, Jereminowicz, Kaim, Kleczkowski, Kropski, Krupa, Malcewicz, Malchowski, Malczewski, Patryk, Petryk, Petrykowski, Polański, Radkiewicz, Radliński, Rudziewicz, Sinicki, Slanka, Ślanka, Stryjeński, Stryjewski, Tarczewski, Tarczowski, Tarczyński, Targowicki, Tudorowiecki, Tudorowski, Walczewski, Zajączkowski, Zirniewicz, Zirymski, Żernicki

Tarnawa is a Polish coat of arms. It was used by several szlachta families in the times of the Polish–Lithuanian Commonwealth.

== Notable bearers ==
Notable bearers of this coat of arms include:

== See also ==
- Polish heraldry
- Heraldry
- Coat of arms
- List of Polish nobility coats of arms

== Sources ==
- Dynastic Genealogy
- Ornatowski.com
