= Chłopicki =

Chłopicki, feminine: Chłopicka is a Polish surname. Notable people with the surname include:

- Józef Chłopicki, (1771–1854), Polish general
- Regina Chłopicka (1934–2021), Polish music theoretician
- Władysław Chłopicki (1894–1980), Polish neurologist
