= Jennifer Dulski =

American technology executive

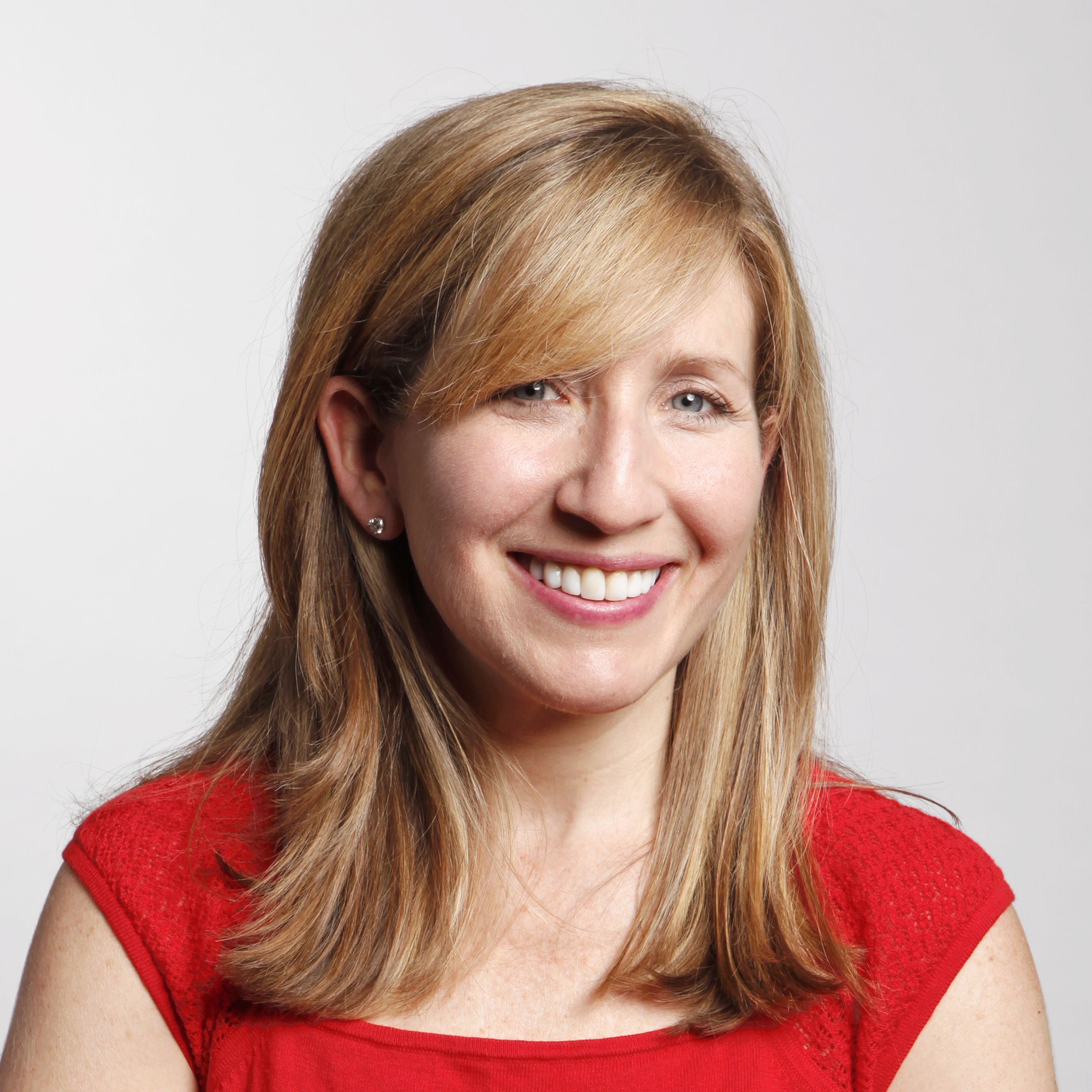
- Education: Cornell University; School for International Training
- Occupations: CEO and Founder, Rising Team
- Employer: Rising Team

Jennifer Dulski is an American technology executive in Silicon Valley. She left Google in January 2013 to become president and COO of Change.org.

She is also the founder and CEO of Rising Team, an AI leadership and team development platform based in Palo Alto, California. Dulski is a lecturer at Stanford Graduate School of Business, where she teaches courses on management and leadership.

== Early life and education ==
Dulski earned a Bachelor of Arts in Psychology from Cornell University in 1993, graduating Phi Beta Kappa, and later received her MBA from Cornell's Johnson Graduate School of Management in 1999 as a Park Leadership Fellow. While at Cornell, she was active in mentoring programs that encouraged women in leadership and business.

== Career ==
After working for Yahoo! she became co-founder and CEO of The Dealmap, which was acquired in 2011 by Google, where she spent almost two years as a senior executive.

At Yahoo!, Dulski worked for nearly ten years, progressing from roles in marketing to serving as Group Vice President and General Manager for Local and Marketplaces. An early Yahoo! employee, she ultimately led one of the company's six business units.

Following the acquisition of The Dealmap by Google in 2011, Dulski joined Google's Ads team, where she led the product team for Google Shopping and contributed to strategic integration and product growth before departing to join Change.org.

Dulski has served on the boards of directors of several companies and nonprofits, including Move, Inc. (operator of Realtor.com), TEGNA, WW International, Arcadia, Little Passports, and the Breakthrough Collaborative. Little Passports, and the Silicon Valley site of The Breakthrough Collaborative.

Dulski joined Change.org after taking action on a petition started by Trayvon Martin's parents, and was later recruited to join the team as its new COO and president.

While at Change.org, she led efforts to expand the company globally, growing its base of users and petition creators worldwide. Her leadership there focused on enabling individuals and communities to advocate for social issues using digital platforms.

In September 2017, Dulski joined Facebook (now Meta) as Head of Groups and Community, where she oversaw the company's work to build stronger online communities. She led several initiatives, including the redesign known as "FB5," which repositioned Facebook around meaningful groups and user connections. She held this position until May 2019.

In 2020, Dulski founded Rising Team, a leadership and team development platform that helps companies develop high-performing leaders and teams at scale. Under her leadership, the company has been covered by Forbes and Fast Company for its work supporting leadership development in hybrid and remote teams and for how they are using AI to create supermanagers.

In 2024, Dulski discussed her hiring philosophy in interviews with CNBC and NBC, emphasizing adaptability and life experience as key "green flags" she looks for in candidates. She has also shared that accepting a career demotion earlier in her life at Yahoo allowed her to realign her path toward meaningful leadership work.

Dulski joined the Board of Directors at WW International (formerly Weight Watchers) in February 2020.

== Publishing ==
In 2018, Dulski published her first book, "Purposeful".

The book "Are You a Manager or a Movement Starter?", became a Wall Street Journal bestseller and focuses on how individuals can lead with purpose to inspire change in the world and within organizations. She frequently contributes to media outlets including Forbes, Fast Company, and CNBC, discussing leadership, team dynamics, and workplace culture.

== Personal and professional activities ==
Dulski is active as a mentor and advisor for startups and leadership programs. She is also a frequent public speaker on the topics of leadership, entrepreneurship, career development, AI, and women in technology.
