= Michałowski =

Michałowski (feminine: Michałowska, plural: Michałowscy) is a Polish surname. It may refer to:

- Aleksander Michałowski (1851–1938), Polish pianist, pedagogue and composer
- Kazimierz Michałowski (1901–1981), Polish archaeologist and Egyptologist, founder of Nubiology
- Mark Michalowski (born 1963), the editor of Shout
- Piotr Michałowski (1800–1855), Polish painter of the Romantic period, known for portraits
- Wiktor Michałowski (died 1973), Polish Army officer who worked at the interbellum Polish Cipher Bureau's German section, B.S.-4

== See also ==
- 7747 Michałowski, main belt asteroid
