= Przemysław Prusinkiewicz =

Polish computer scientist

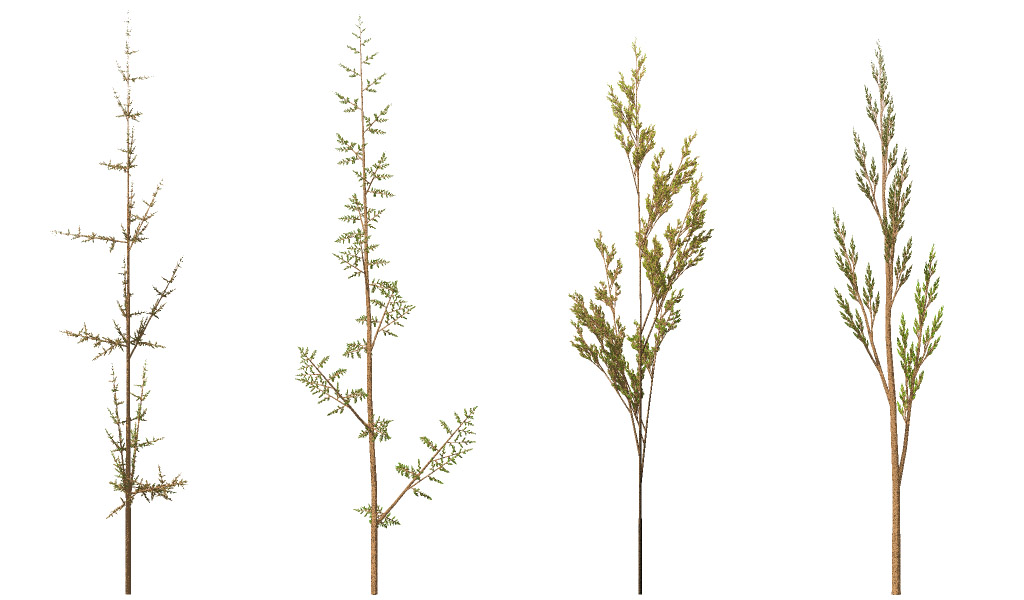
Plant-like structures generated by L-systems

Przemysław (Przemek) Prusinkiewicz [ˈpʂɛmɛk pruɕiŋˈkjevit͡ʂ] (born 1952), is a Polish computer scientist who advanced the idea that Fibonacci numbers in nature can be in part understood as the expression of certain algebraic constraints on free groups, specifically as certain Lindenmayer grammars. Prusinkiewicz's main work is on the modeling of plant growth through such grammars.

== Early life and education ==
in 1978 Prusinkiewicz received his PhD from Warsaw University of Technology.

== Career ==
As of 2008 he was a professor of Computer Science at the University of Calgary.

== Awards ==
Prusinkiewicz received the 1997 SIGGRAPH Computer Graphics Achievement Award for his work.

== Influences ==
In 2006, Michael Hensel examined the work of Prusinkiewicz and his collaborators - the Calgary team - in an article published in Architectural Design. Hensel argued that the Calgary team's computational plant models or "virtual plants" which culminated in software they developed capable of modeling various plant characteristics, could provide important lessons for architectural design. Architects would learn from "the self-organisation processes underlying the growth of living organisms" and the Calgary team's work uncovered some of that potential. Their computational models allowed for a "quantitative understanding of developmental mechanisms" and had the potential to "lead to a synthetic understanding of the interplay between various aspects of development."

Prusinkiewicz's work was informed by that of the Hungarian biologist Aristid Lindenmayer who developed the theory of L-systems in 1968. Lindenmayer used L-systems to describe the behaviour of plant cells and to model the growth processes, plant development and the branching architecture of plant development.

== Publications ==
- Prusinkiewicz, Przemysław; James Hanan (1989). Lindenmayer Systems, Fractals, and Plants (Lecture Notes in Biomathematics). Springer-Verlag. ISBN 978-0-387-97092-9.
- Meinhardt, Hans; Przemysław Prusinkiewicz; Deborah R. Fowler (2003-02-12). The Algorithmic Beauty of Sea Shells (3rd ed.). Springer-Verlag. ISBN 978-3-540-44010-9.
