= Radoszewski =

Radoszewski is a Polish surname.

People with the surname Radoszewski include:

- Bogusław Radoszewski (c. 1577–1638), Polish noble and Roman Catholic priest
- Wojciech Radoszewski (1721–1796), Polish noble and Roman Catholic priest
