= Yakhimovich =

Yakhimovich is a Russian and Belarusian-language spelling of an East Slavic patronymic surname derived from the given name Yakhim, Joachim. It has been transliterated in various ways, e.g., Polish: Jachimowicz, Ukrainian: Yakhymovych. Notable people with the surname include:

- Erik Yakhimovich (born 1968), Belarusian former professional footballer
- Hryhoriy Yakhymovych (1792–1863), Metropolitan Archbishop of the Ukrainian Greek Catholic Church
- Robert Jachimowicz (born 1967), Polish Paralympian athlete
- Shelly Yachimovich (born 1960), Israeli politician

== See also ==
- Similar etymology: Jaćimović, Efimovich
- Another Bealrussian-language variant: Yafimovich
