= Kosinskoye, Vladimir Oblast =

Kosinskoye Косинское
- Selo
- Location within Vladimir Oblast Location within Russia
- Coordinates: 56°30′N 39°34′E
- Country: Russia
- Region: Vladimir Oblast
- District: Yuryev-Polsky District
- Time zone: UTC+3:00

Kosinskoye (Russian: Косинское) is a rural locality (a selo) in Krasnoselskoye Rural Settlement, Yuryev-Polsky District, Vladimir Oblast, Russia. The population was 729 as of 2010. There are 12 streets.

== Geography ==
Kosinskoye is located 10 km west of Yuryev-Polsky (the district's administrative centre) by road. Afineyevo is the nearest rural locality.
