= Magdalena Heydel =

Polish philologist and translator (born 1969)

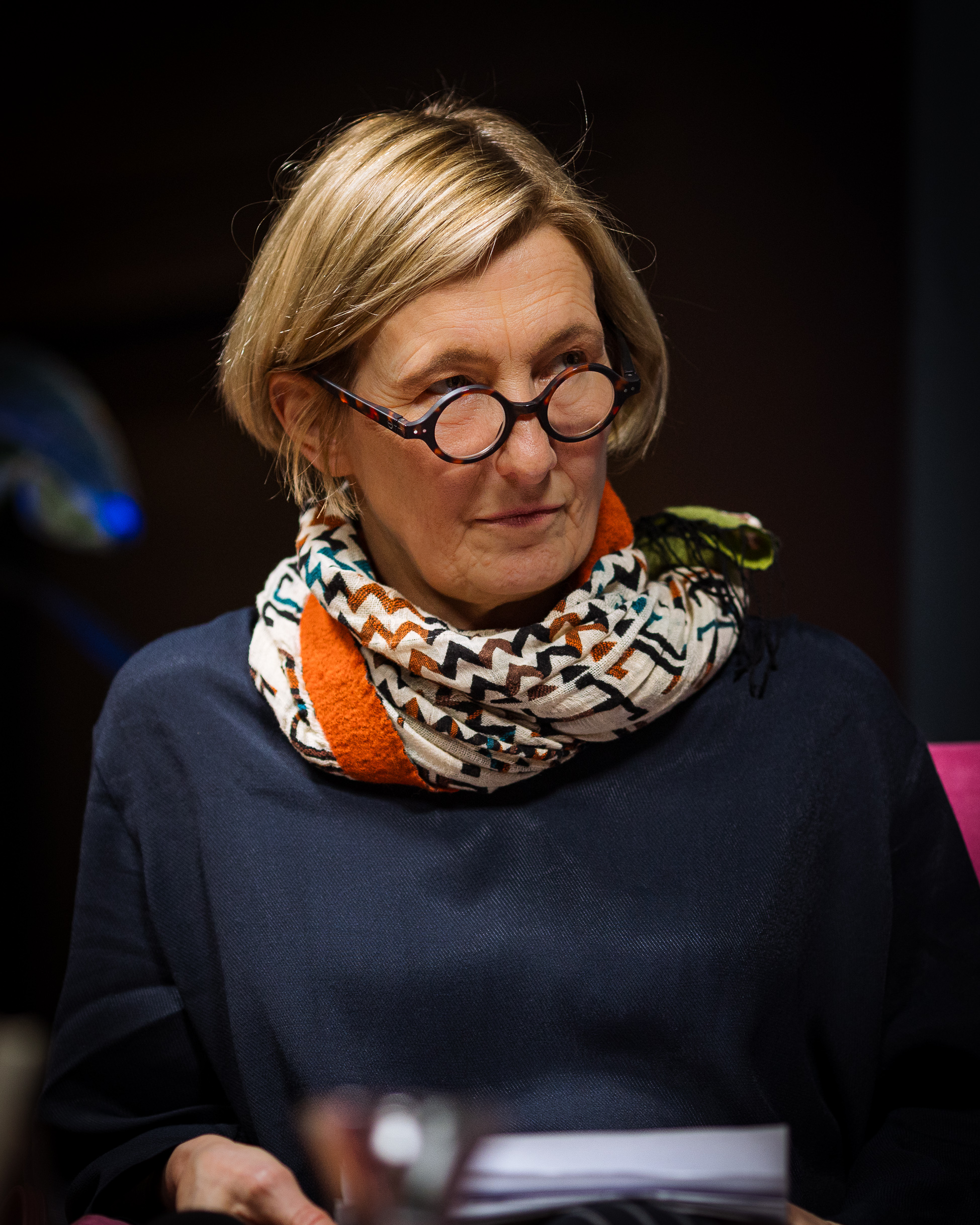
Magda Heydel in 2026

Magdalena Heydel (born 12 December 1969), known also as Magda Heydel, is a Polish philologist and translator.

== Biography ==
Heydel was born on 12 December 1969 in Katowice. She graduated from Jagiellonian University in Kraków, with the degree of doctor of philology in 2001 and doktor habilitowany in 2013. She is now a lecturer at this same university. Among her scholarly interests are Translation Studies, comparative literature and literary criticism. She is editor-in-chief of Przekładaniec. A Journal of Translation Studies. She is active in the field of literary translation, translating both poetry and prose. She translated many works by Joseph Conrad, Virginia Woolf, Seamus Heaney, T.S. Eliot and Ted Hughes.

Together with Piotr Bukowski, she edited two Translation Studies anthologies in Polish: Contemporary Translation Theories (2009) and Polish Concepts in Translation (2013).

== Bibliography ==
- Magda Heydel, Zwrot kulturowy w badaniach nad przekładem.
- Magda Heydel, Jan Rybicki, The Stylometry of Collaborative Translation.
