= Konopka =

Konopka is a Polish surname. People with this name include:

- Andrzej Konopka (actor) (born 1969), Polish actor
- Bruce Konopka (1919–1996), American baseball player
- Chris Konopka (born 1985), American soccer player
- Dan Konopka (born 1974), American drummer
- Dave Konopka (born 1976), American bassist
- Gerhard Konopka (1911–1997), German Wehrmacht major during World War II
- Harald Konopka (born 1952), German football player
- Jan Konopka (1777–1814), Polish fighter for national independence and a general in Napoleon's army
- Joseph Konopka (born 1976), American criminal
- Kazimierz Konopka (1769–1805/9), Polish activist
- Magda Konopka (born 1943), Polish former model and actress
- Miloslav Konopka (born 1979), Slovak hammer thrower
- Mikuláš Konopka (born 1979), Slovak shot putter
- Piotr Nowina-Konopka (born 1949), Polish politician and vice-rector
- Ronald J. Konopka (1947–2015), American geneticist who studied chronobiology
- Tadeusz W. Konopka (1923–1986), American actor and comedian, aka Ted Knight
- Zenon Konopka (born 1981), Canadian ice hockey player

== See also ==
- Maria Konopnicka
