= Aristid Lindenmayer =

Hungarian biologist

- Born: 17 November 1925; Budapest, Kingdom of Hungary
- Died: 30 October 1989 (aged 63); Huis ter Heide, Utrecht, The Netherlands
- Education: University of Budapest; University of Michigan
- Known for: L-systems

Aristid Lindenmayer (17 November 1925 – 30 October 1989) was a Hungarian biologist. In 1968 he developed a type of formal language today called L-systems or Lindenmayer systems. Using those systems Lindenmayer modelled the behaviour of cells of plants. L-systems nowadays are also used to model whole plants.

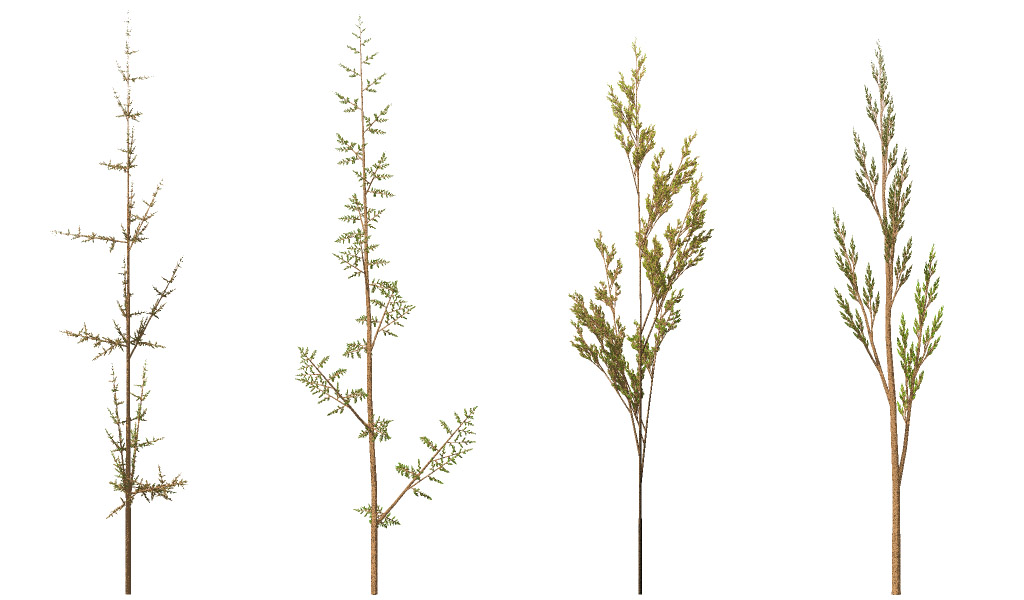
Plant representations generated using an L-system in 3D.

Lindenmayer worked with yeast and filamentous fungi and studied the growth patterns of various types of algae, such as the blue/green bacteria Anabaena catenula. Originally the L-systems were devised to provide a formal description of the development of such simple multicellular organisms, and to illustrate the neighbourhood relationships between plant cells. Later on, this system was extended to describe higher plants and complex branching structures.

== Career ==
Lindenmayer studied chemistry and biology at the Eötvös Loránd University of Budapest from 1943 to 1948. He received his Ph.D. in plant physiology in 1956 at the University of Michigan. In 1968 he became professor in Philosophy of Life Sciences and Biology at the University of Utrecht, The Netherlands. From 1972 onward he headed the Theoretical Biology Group at Utrecht University.

== Publications ==
- Aristid Lindenmayer, "Mathematical models for cellular interaction in development." J. Theoret. Biology, 18:280—315, 1968.
- Prusinkiewicz, Przemysław; Aristid Lindenmayer (1990). The Algorithmic Beauty of Plants (The Virtual Laboratory). Springer-Verlag. ISBN 0-387-97297-8. (available as a PDF)
- Further publications
