= Radecki =

Radecki (feminine Radecka) is a Polish surname. Notable people include:

- Adam Radecki (born 1994), Polish footballer
- Barbara Radecki, Canadian actress
- Jan Mikulicz-Radecki (1850–1905), Polish-Austrian surgeon
- John Radecki (1865–1955), Australian stained-glass artist
- Mateusz Radecki (born 1993), Polish footballer
- Milena Radecka (born 1984), Polish volleyball player
- Olga Radecki (1858-1933), Russian composer, conductor and pianist
- Thomas Radecki (born 1946), former American psychiatrist
- Zuzanna Radecka (born 1975), Polish sprinter
- Roman Radecki (born 2007), Amercian Collegiate long distants runner
