= Palmowski =

Trzaska coat of arms, used by some of Palmowski family

Palmowski (feminine: Palmowska; plural: Palmowscy) is a Polish surname. Some of them use Trzaska coat of arms. Notable people with the surname include:

- Alisha Palmowski (born 2006), British racing driver
- Józefa Palmowska (1934–2021), Polish politician, member of the Sejm
- Krystyna Palmowska (1948–2025), Polish alpinist, mountaineer and engineer
- Sawa Palmowski (died 1797), Orthodox cleric of the Polish–Lithuanian Commonwealth, a hegumen
- Tadeusz Palmowski (born 1952), Polish geographer, professor at the University of Gdańsk
