= Zabielski =

Trzaska coat of arms, used by some of Zabielski family

Zabielski (feminine: Zabielska, plural: Zabielscy) is a Polish surname. Notable people with the surname include:

- Jerzy Zabielski (1897–1958), Polish fencer
- Romuald Zabielski (born 1960), Polish veterinary scientist and professor at the Warsaw University of Life Sciences
