= Aryeh Leib Yellin =

Polish rabbi (1820–1886)

Aryeh Leib Yellin (1820 in Jasionówka, Mońki County – 2 April 1886) (or Jelin [in Polish], Hebrew: אריה ליב יעלין) was rabbi of Bielsk Podlaski, Poland.

He was one of the most prominent Polish rabbis, to whom halakic matters were frequently referred for decision. He was the author of Kol Aryeh and Miẓpeh Aryeh, novellæ on various Talmudical tractates. His most important production is the Yefeh 'Enayim, (trans.: "beautiful eyes") giving the parallel passages found in the Babylonian Talmud, the Yerushalmi, the Midrashim, the Pesichtas, and other ancient rabbinic productions, occasionally with critical remarks which are of the greatest value to the rabbinic student. The Yefeh 'Enayim accompanies the Talmudic text in the new Talmud editions of the Romms of Wilna. Yellin left in manuscript many novellæ on the Talmud and a collection of responsa.
