= Bielsk Podlaski =

- Town
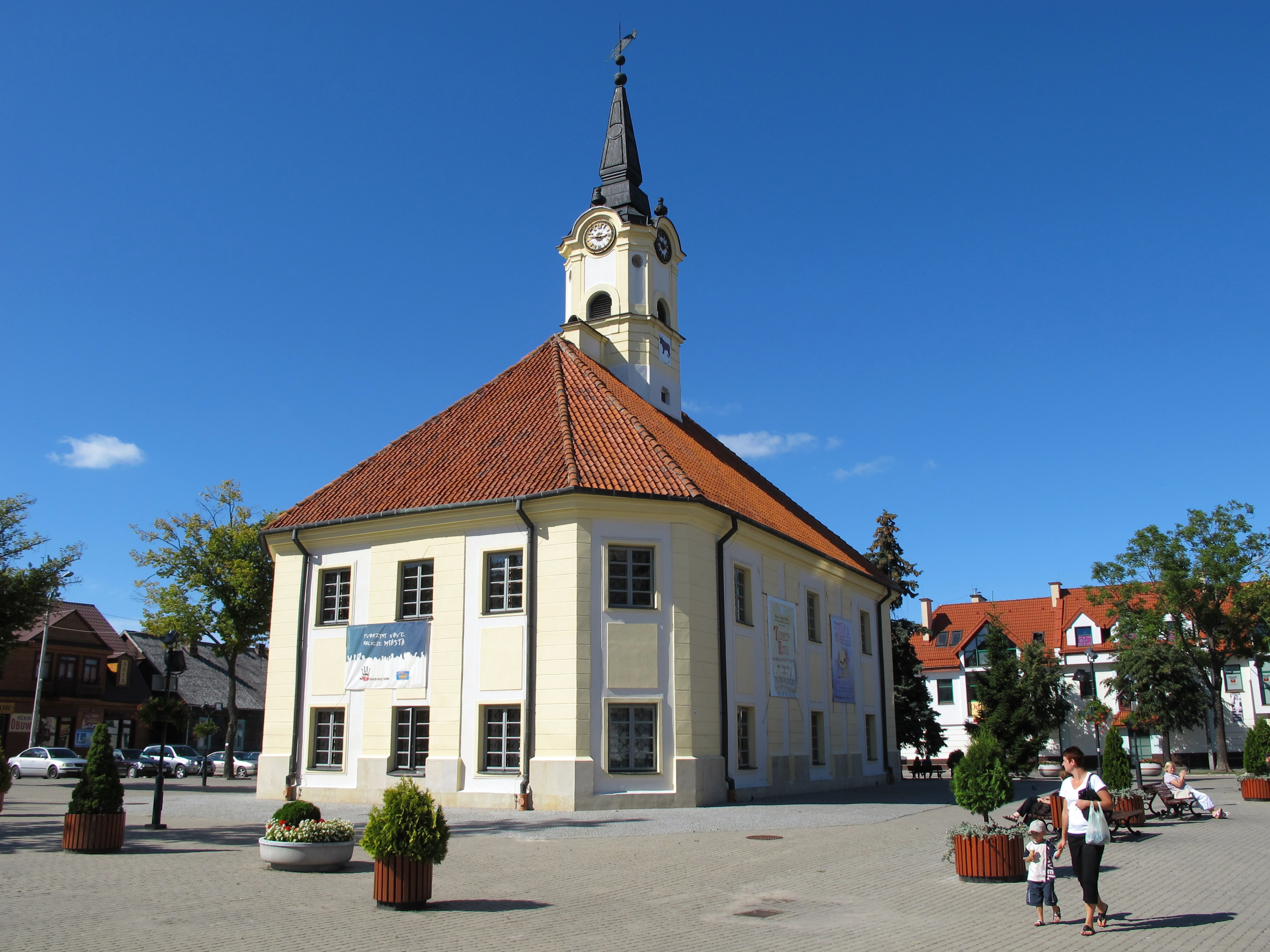
- Marketplace and historical Baroque town hall

- Coat of arms

- Location within Poland
- Coordinates: 52°46′N 23°12′E
- Country: Poland
- Voivodeship: Podlaskie
- County: Bielsk
- Gmina: Bielsk Podlaski (urban gmina)
- Established: 12th century
- Town rights: 1495

Government
  - Mayor: Piotr Wawulski

Area
  - Total: 27.01 km^{2} (10.43 sq mi)

Population (31 December 2021)
  - Total: 24,719
  - Density: 915/km^{2} (2,370/sq mi)
- Time zone: UTC+1 (CET)
  - Summer (DST): UTC+2 (CEST)
- Postal code: 17-100 to 17-102
- Area code: +48 085
- Car plates: BBI
- Website: http://umbielskpodlaski.pl/

Bielsk Podlaski (Note: [ˈbʲɛlsk pɔdˈlaskʲi] (Belarusian: Бельск Падляскі, Lithuanian: Palenkės Belskas, Yiddish: ביעלסק, romanized: Bielsk)) is a town in eastern Poland, within Bielsk County in the Podlaskie Voivodeship. As of December 2021, the town has a population of 24,883.

== History ==
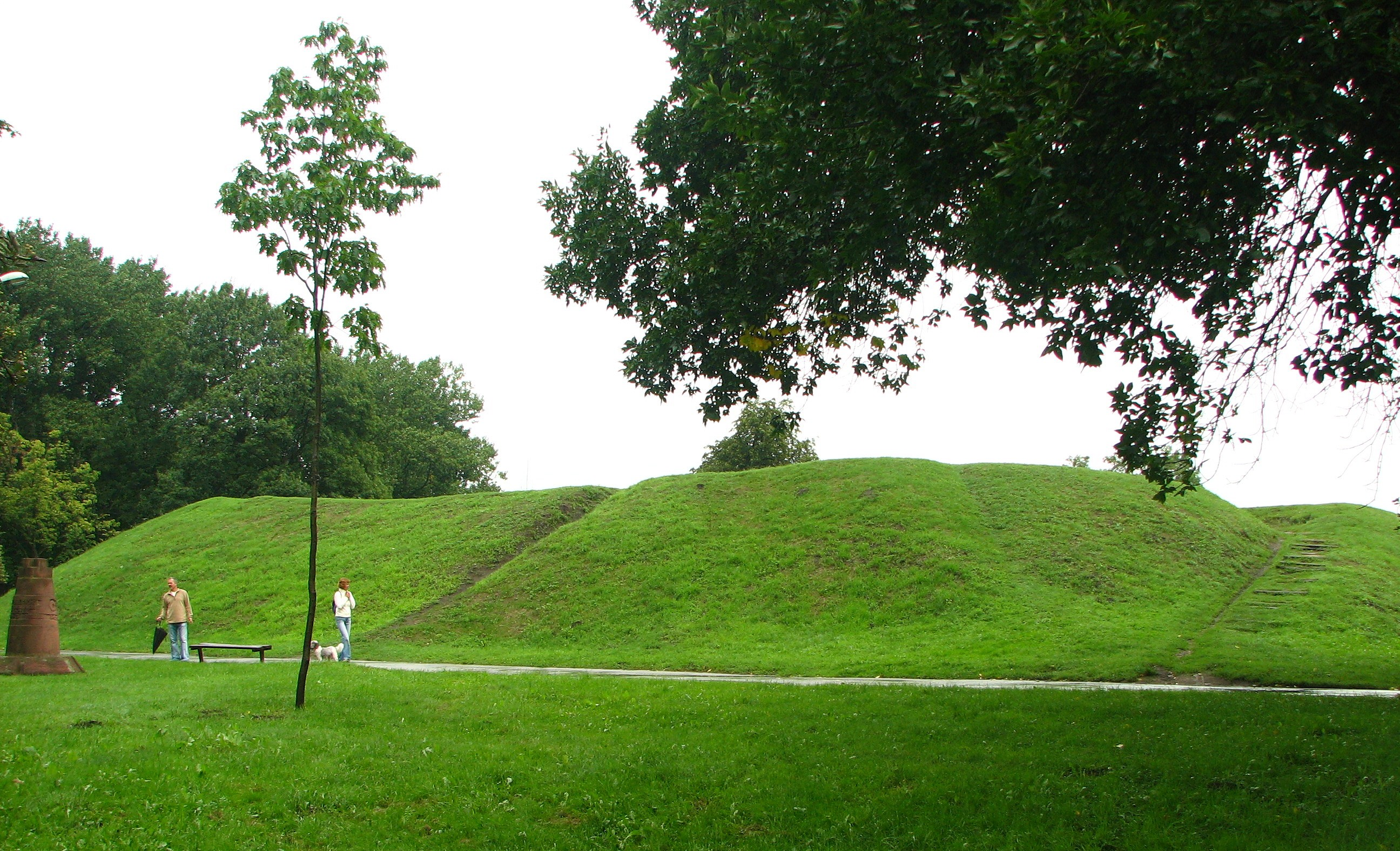
Castle Hill, the site of the former medieval stronghold

Bielsk Podlaski has a long and rich history, dating back to the 12th century, when this area of Poland belonged to Kievan Rus', but was populated by Lithuanian tribe Yotvingians for at least 4000 years. The gord of Bielsk was probably founded by Ruthenian dukes, and its existence was first mentioned in 1253, in the so-called Hypatian Codex. In 1273, Bielsk was recaptured by Lithuanian duke Traidenis, and in the early 14th century, whole province of Podlasie became annexed by the Grand Duchy of Lithuania. The region was subject to Teutonic Knights raids, which took place in 1346 and 1379.

In 1382, Masovian Duke Janusz I of Warsaw captured Bielsk, Drohiczyn, Suraż and Mielnik, taking advantage of the Lithuanian Civil War (1381–84). Next year, Jogaila pushed the Mazovians out of Bielsko, handing the gord over to Vytautas (Witold). In 1390, Jogaila, who had become King of Poland as Władysław II Jagiełło, handed Bielsk, Suraż, Drohiczyn and Mielnik over to Janusz I.

Due to its convenient location along a merchant route from Kraków to Vilnius, Bielsk became an important center of trade and administration. In late November 1412, it was visited by King Władysław II Jagiełło, and 1413, the Land of Drohiczyn, together with Bielsk, became part of Trakai Voivodeship. In 1430, Duke Vytautas named first vogt of Bielsko, a man named Andrzej. A number of Poles from Mazovia begin to settle in Podlasie.

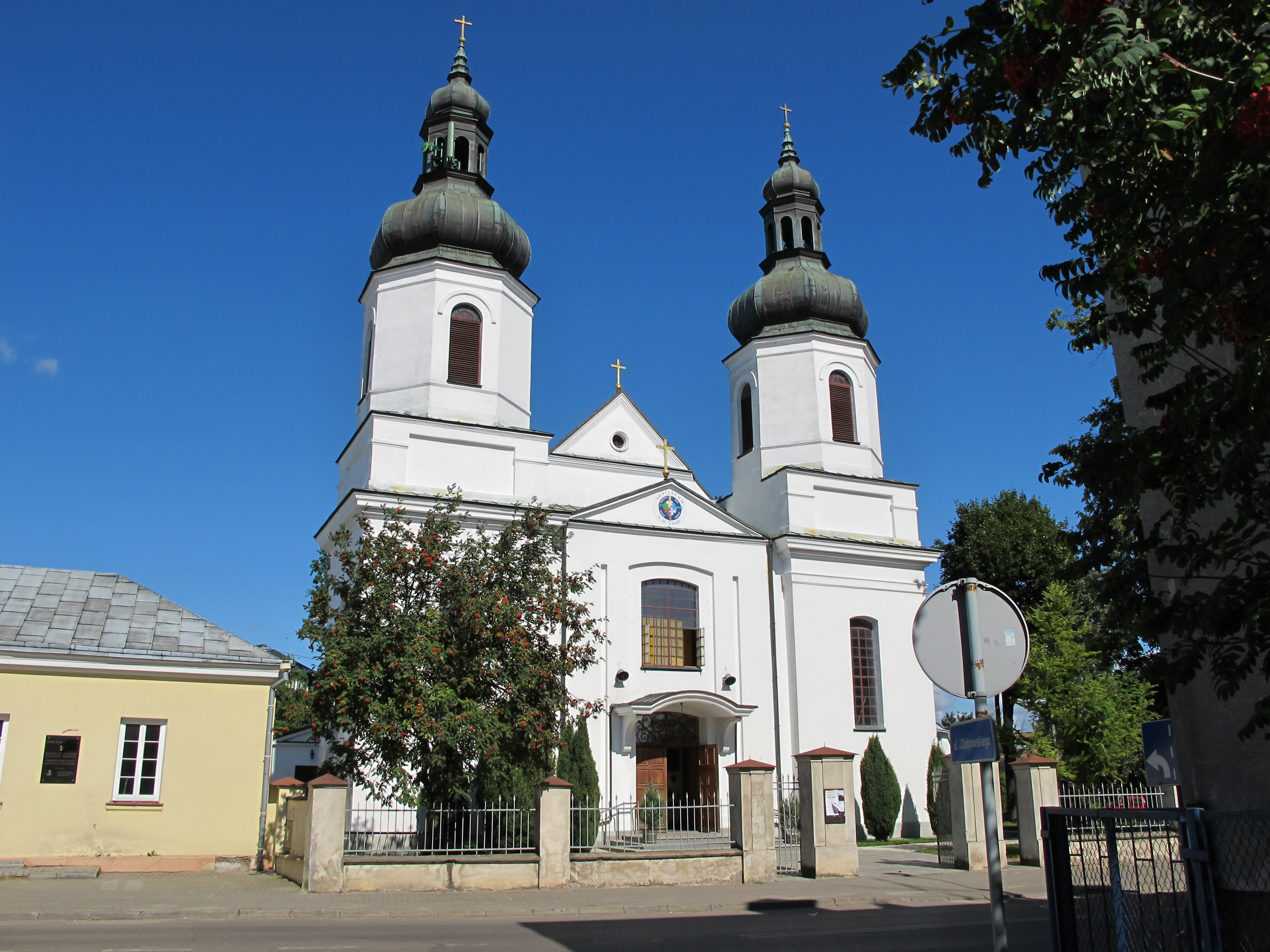
Baroque Roman Catholic Church of Our Lady of Mount Carmel

Bielsk received its Magdeburg rights town charter on 18 November 1495, from King Alexander I Jagiellon. In September 1501, a meeting of Lithuanian nobility took place here. Several Polish rulers visited Bielsk, such as Władysław II Jagiełło, Alexander I (1505), Sigismund I the Old (1506, 1509), and Sigismund II Augustus (1564). In 1513, Bielsk was named capital of the newly created Podlaskie Voivodeship; by 1563, the town had 830 houses, and was also main center of the Land of Bielsko.

In early summer of 1564, when king Sigismund II Augustus stayed here with Primate Jakub Uchański, to discuss the new Polish-Lithuanian union (see Union of Lublin), the wooden castle of Bielsk burned to the ground, with the king watching the incident from the stables. A new castle for the local starosta was built in Hołowiesko (located within present-day town limits of Bielsk), while the land court was moved to Brańsk.

Following the Union of Lublin (1569), Bielsko was transferred from Grand Duchy of Lithuania into the Kingdom of Poland. Bielsk was a royal town of Poland, administratively located in the Podlaskie Voivodeship in the Lesser Poland Province. The town prospered, with churches, hospital, mills, shops and 265 artisans (as for 1576). Bielsko burned in 1591, and Swedish invasion of Poland brought almost complete destruction (1655). The Carmelites Church in Bielsk and monastery was founded in 1641 by magnate Adam Kazanowski (starost of Bielsk from 1638) and dedicated to the Mother of God of Mount Carmel. The project was also financed by his wife Elżbieta (Halszka) Słuszczanka (around 1619-1671). The 3rd Polish National Cavalry Brigade was stationed in Bielsk in 1792.

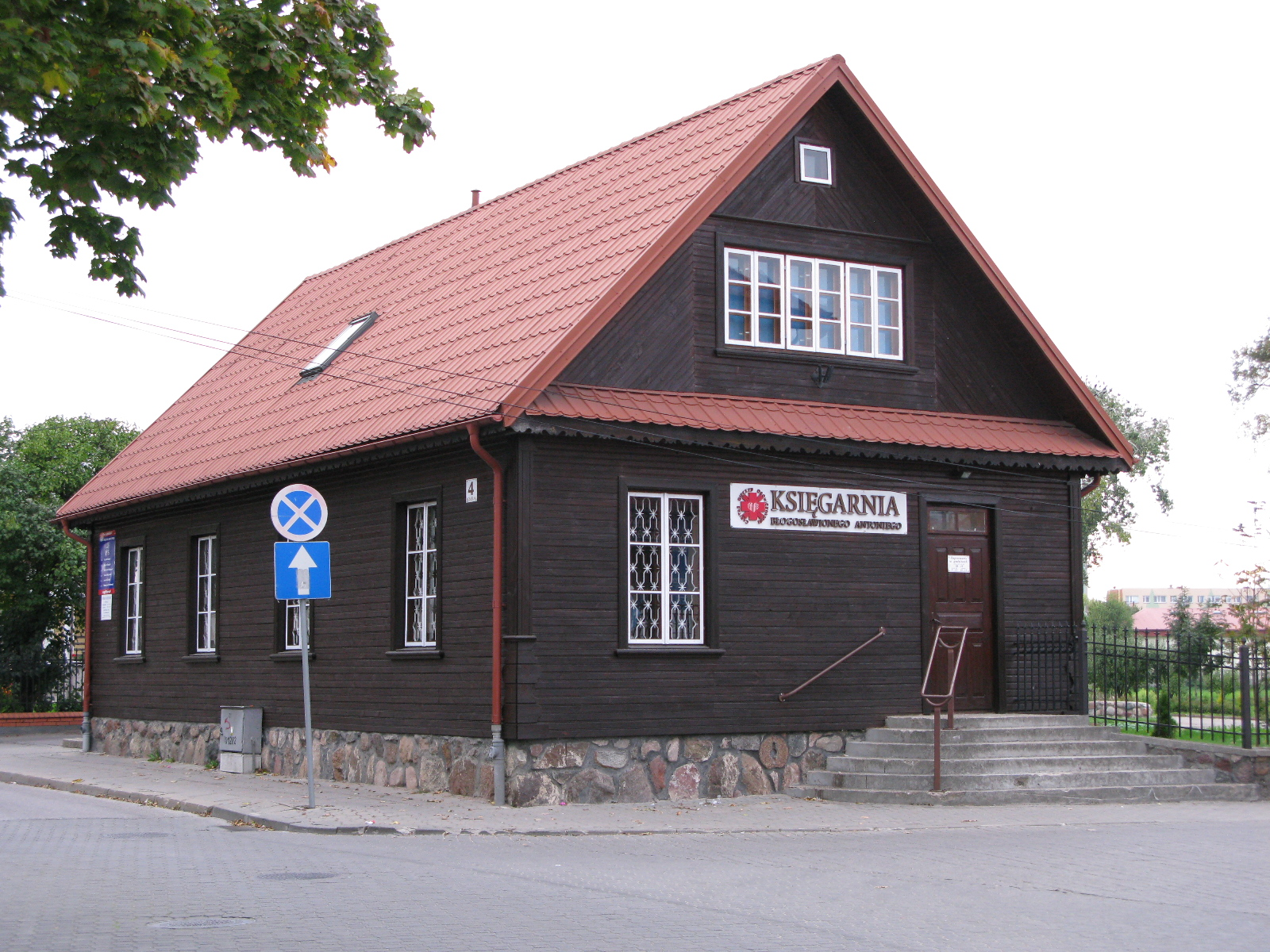
A historical house from 1909. Preserved wooden architecture can still be found in some parts of the town

Following the Third Partition of Poland, Bielsk briefly belonged to the Kingdom of Prussia (1795–1807): after the Treaties of Tilsit, it was transferred to the Russian Empire. From 1843, it belonged to the Grodno Governorate. Residents of the area actively participated in the largest 19th-century Polish uprisings (November Uprising and January Uprising). Bielsk was one of the sites of Russian executions of Polish insurgents during the January Uprising of 1863-1864. Additionally, in September 1863, as punishment for supporting the uprising, Russians plundered the nearby village of Łukawica, and expelled its entire population, which was forcibly marched to Bielsk, and then deported to katorga in Siberia. Two people died during the march from Łukawica to Bielsk: an old man and a child. As part of the post-uprising anti-Polish repressions, the town was subjected to Russification, the local Catholic church was closed down, and Polish clergy was also deported to Siberia. Edward Kiersnowski, leader of a local insurgent unit, who fought in several battles in the region, died while being deported to Siberia in 1864. In 1873, Bielsk received rail connection with Brest Litovsk, and in 1915, during World War I, German troops burned the rail station. Germans retreated from the town in February 1919, and were replaced by Polish Army units. In late July 1920, during the Polish-Soviet War, Bielsk was briefly occupied by the Red Army. In the Second Polish Republic, Bielsk administratively belonged to the Białystok Voivodeship.

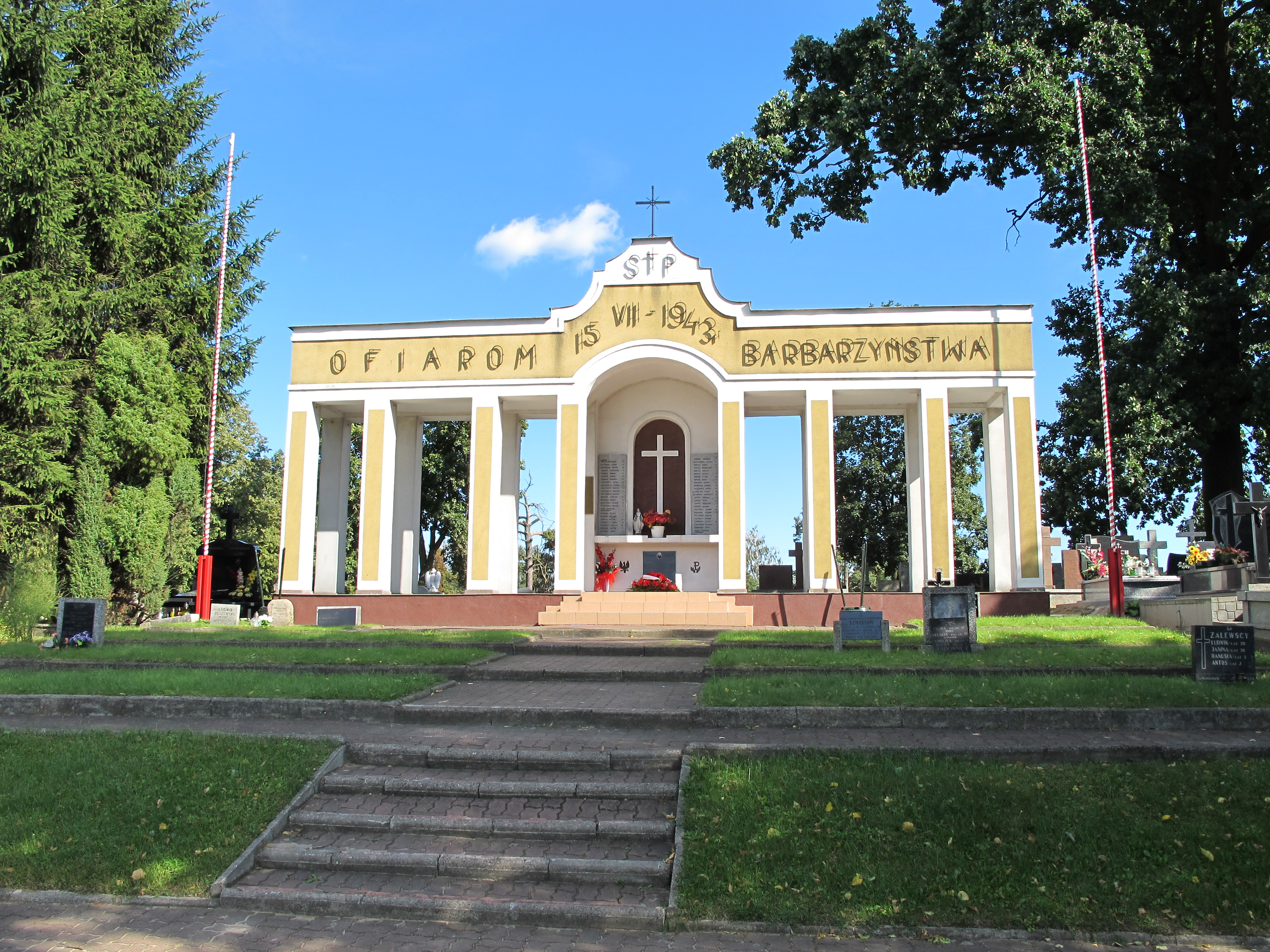
Grave and memorial of 49 Poles massacred by the Germans on 15 July 1943

During the 1939 joint German-Soviet invasion of Poland, which started World War II, the town was captured by the Wehrmacht, which on 23 September handed it over to the Soviets, who occupied it until 23 June 1941, forcibly sending thousands to Siberia. In 1941-1944, the town was occupied by Nazi Germany. Germans murdered its Jewish minority, and in a nearby forest killed approximately 800 Poles. The Germans also operated a forced labour camp in the town. A pogrom took place in Bielsk Podlaski from 5 to 7 July 1941. Between 2 and 15 November 1942, approximately 7,000 local Jews and 4,000 more from Boćki, Brańsk, Narew, Orla, Rudka, and Kleszczele (where the Jews from Milejczyce had been relocated earlier) who had been herded into Bielsk Podlaski, which became a transit ghetto for eleven to fifteen thousand Jews, were deported from the ghetto of Bielsk Podlaski to Treblinka. Bielsk was captured by the Red Army on 30 July 1944. The Russians then carried out arrests of local Polish resistance members, including 12 officers of the local command of the Home Army, who were arrested on 4 August 1944 in nearby Brańsk, where they were deceitfully gathered for a supposed formal meeting with the command of the Soviet 65th Army. The town was soon restored to Poland.

Bielsk Podlaski has a rich Jewish history which was wiped out in the Holocaust.

== Demographics ==
Detailed data as of 31 December 2021:

Description	All		Women		Men	
Unit	person	percentage	person	percentage	person	percentage
Population	24719	100	12911	52.2%	11808	47.8%
Population density	915.2		478.0		437.2	

=== 1897 census ===
The most spoken languages in Bielsk Podlaski according to the Russian Imperial Census of 1897:

Language	Population	Proportion
Jewish	4,064	54.45%
Russian	1,499	20.08%
Polish	1,006	13.48%
Ukrainian	556	7.45%
Belarusian	244	3.27%
German	58	0.78%
Other	37	0.5%
Total	7,464	100.00%

=== Jews ===
Jews appeared in Bielsk Podlaski as early as the 15th century. In 1487, King Casimir IV Jagiellon leased the customs house in Bielsk Podlaski to 2 Jews from Lutsk. The Jews residing in Bielsk Podlaski at that time did not form a community due to their small numbers (a few families). In 1542, the existence of a Jewish community in the city was confirmed. There was also a synagogue mentioned. In 1564, there were conflicts in the city between Christians and Jews, and two years later King Sigismund Augustus had to resolve this dispute: Jews were then granted new privileges. This state of affairs did not last long, however, because the censuses from 1580 and 1591 do not show any Orthodox Jews in Bielsk Podlaski, which would mean that there were no Jews in Bielsk at the turn of the 16th century. The Jewish community in Bielsk Podlaski was supposed to have existed until 1662. Jews began to flow to Bielsk again at the turn of the 18th century. In 1771, there was already a Qahal. Officially, Jews were allowed to settle in Bielsk only at the turn of 1802/1803. In 1807, a Jewish community was established, and in that year, out of the 1836 inhabitants of the city, there were 31 Jews. A year later, there were 64, and in 1816, 94 Jews. In 1861, there were 1,256 Jews living in the city and 3 houses of prayer. In 1878, out of 5,810 citizens of the city, there were already 3,968 Jews. After the 1897 census, out of 7,464 residents, there were 4,097 Jews. In 1938, they were about 38% of the total population.

The largest concentration of Jewish houses and squares in Bielsk Podlaski was located around the main market square, the central point of which was the town hall, full of Jewish shops, and on the eastern side of the market square. Jews also lived along the main streets of the city: Mickiewicza, Szkolna, Boźnicza, Waska, Widowska and Ogrodowa. The main wooden synagogue was located in the very center. There were several other houses of prayer around it, including one on Wąska Street (demolished after the war). The Jewish cemetery, old, no longer in existence, was in the city center, and the other one was on the road to Brańsk. The last rabbi to serve was Mosze Aron Bendas.

The construction of the main wooden synagogue began in place of the old one in 1898. The synagogue was named "Jafe Einan". On Boznicza Street, also called "Beth Midrasz Gas" stood the third synagogue called "Beth Midrasz Szarej Zion". It was a wooden synagogue that was built on the site of the old one, which had burned down during World War I. Next to this synagogue there was a mikveh, a Talmud Torah school, a yeshiva and an orphanage. In 1889, another wooden house of prayer was opened on Rynkova and Preczistninskaya (Puszkina) streets. It was funded by Joel Landau and Tanchiel Grodzinski.

== Municipal government ==
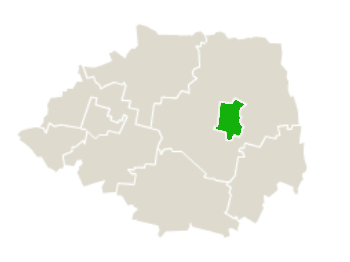
Bielsk Podlaski (Town) in Bielsk County

=== Executive branch ===
The chief executive of the government is the mayor (Polish: Burmistrz). As of 2022, the mayor of Bielsk Podlaski is Jarosław Bobrowski.

=== Legislative branch ===
The legislative portion of the government is the council (Polish: Rada), composed of the president (Polish: Przewodniczący), the vice president (Polish: Wiceprzewodniczący) and thirteen councilors.

=== Neighbouring political subdivisions ===
Bielsk Podlaski (town) is bordered by Gmina Bielsk Podlaski. The town is the seat of Gmina Bielsk Podlaski, although it is not a part of it.

== Climate ==
The region has a continental climate which is characterized by mild summers and long and frosty winters. The average amount of precipitation during the year exceeds 550 millimetres (21.7 in). In winter, precipitation is mostly snow.

Climate data for Bielsk Podlaski
Month	Jan	Feb	Mar	Apr	May	Jun	Jul	Aug	Sep	Oct	Nov	Dec	Year
Mean daily maximum °C (°F)	−3 (29)	−3 (31)	4 (40)	11 (52)	17 (63)	20 (68)	21 (70)	21 (70)	16 (61)	11 (51)	4 (39)	1 (33)	11 (51)
Mean daily minimum °C (°F)	−6 (21)	−6 (21)	−2 (28)	2 (35)	7 (45)	10 (50)	12 (54)	11 (52)	8 (46)	4 (39)	0 (32)	−4 (25)	3 (37)
Source: Weatherbase

== Geography ==
Bielsk Podlaski is located in the geographical region of Europe known as the Podlasie-Belarus Plateau and the mesoregion known as the Bielsk plain.

The town covers an area of 27.01 square kilometres (10.4 sq mi).

== Transport ==
The S19 expressway bypasses Bielsk Podlaski to the west. Exits 15 and 14 provide access to the town. National road 66 bypasses Bielsk Podlaski to the south and connects it to the town of Zambrów to the west.

Bielsk Podlaski lies on the main railway line between Białystok and Siedlce. A railway line of secondary importance links Bielsk Podlaski to the town of Hajnówka to the east.

== Sports ==
The main sports club of the town is Tur Bielsk Podlaski with basketball and football sections.

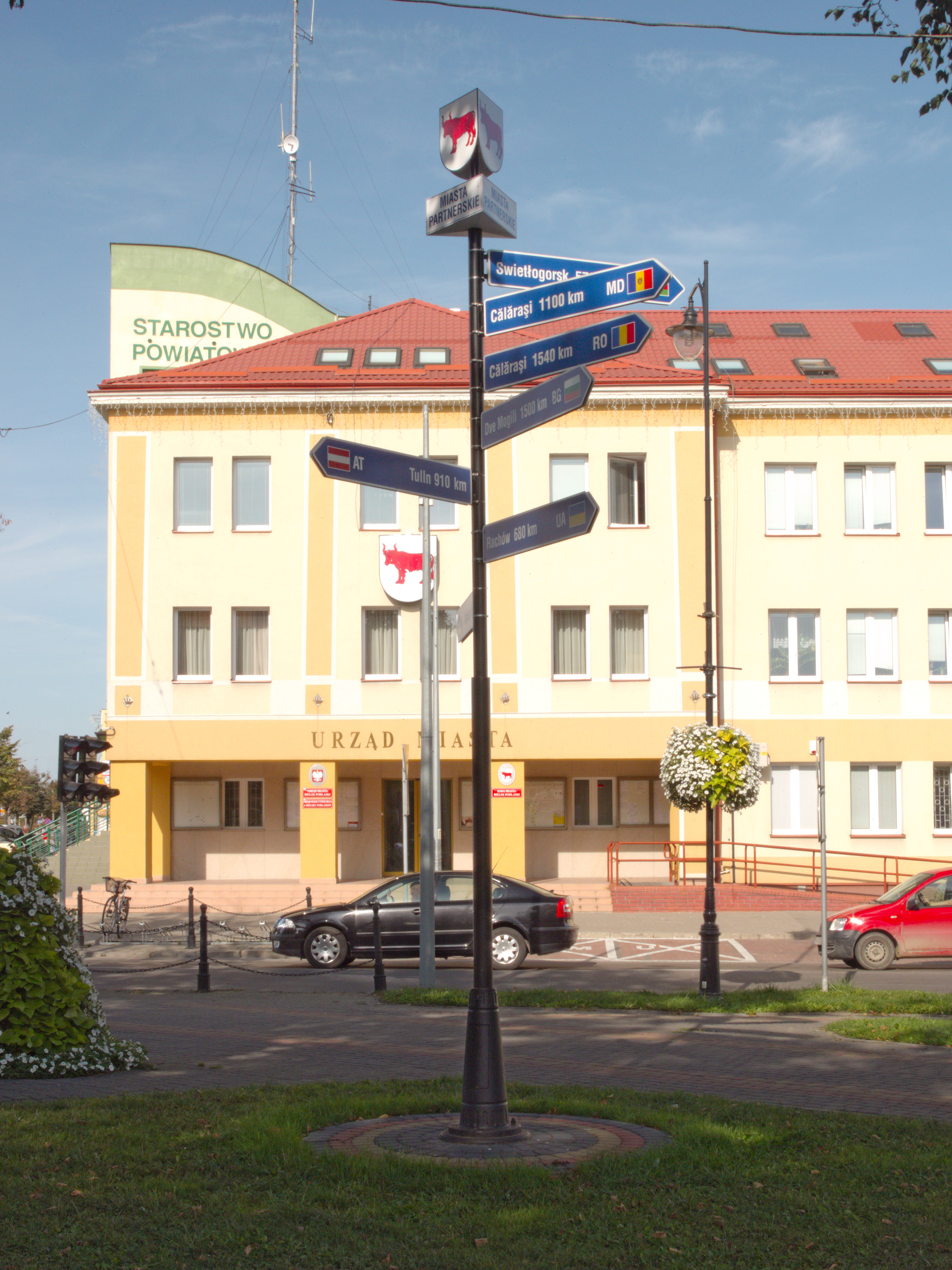
Twin town sign in Bielsk Podlaski

== Twin towns – sister cities ==
Bielsk Podlaski is twinned with:

- Călăraşi, Moldova
- Călăraşi, Romania
- Dve Mogili, Bulgaria
- Kingisepp, Russia
- Kobryn, Belarus
- Rakhiv, Ukraine
- Svetlahorsk, Belarus

== Notable people ==
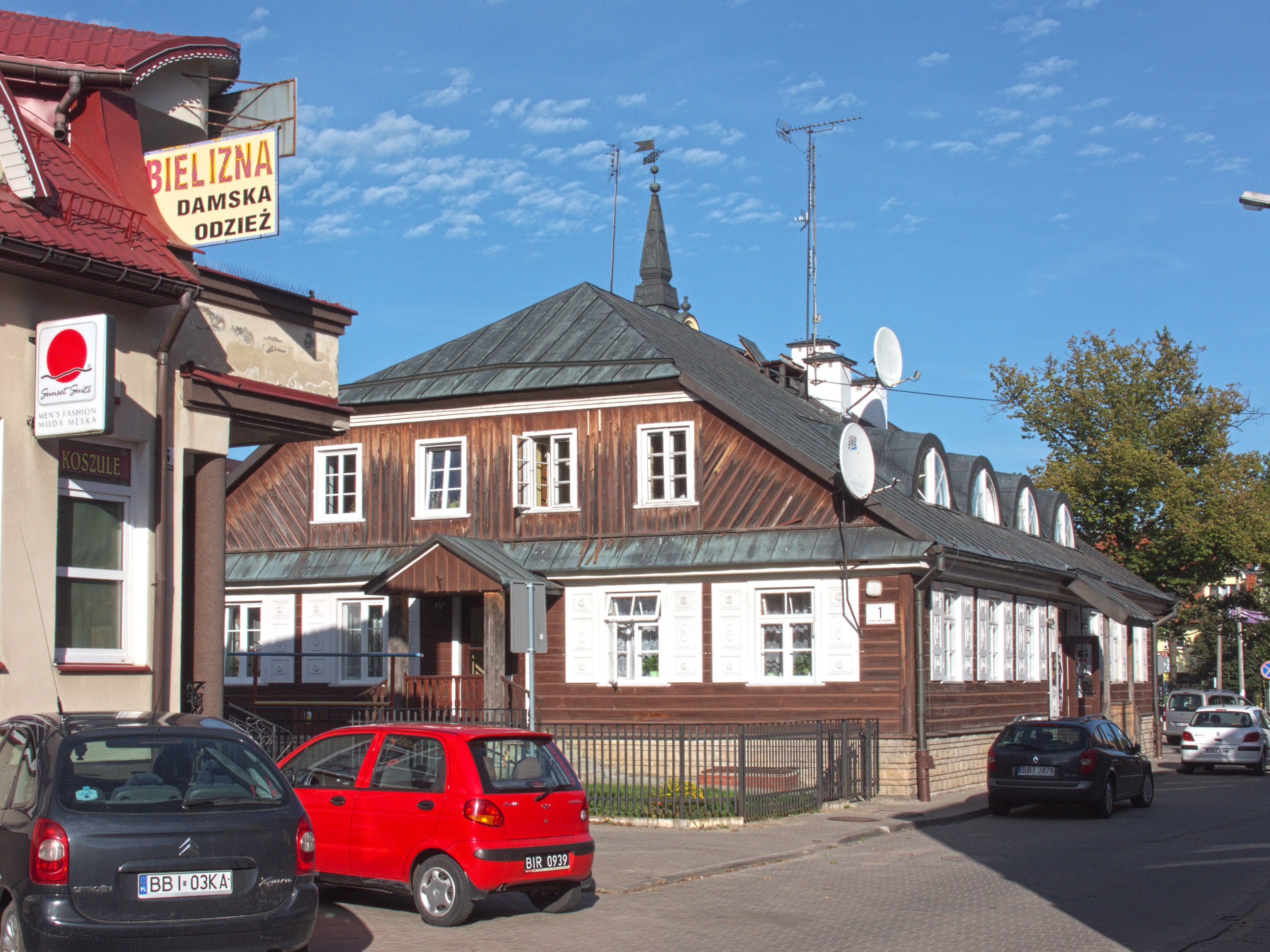
A wooden inn called Słuszna near the marketplace and town hall

- Nadzieja Artymowicz, Belarusian poet
- Wojciech Borecki, football manager
- Jarosław Borowski, scrablista
- Yakau Branshteyn, Belarusian literary critic
- Piotr Bujko, Ukrainian doctor of Belarusian origin
- Mirosław Car, football player
- Małgorzata Dmitruk, painter
- Lech Feszler, senator
- Doroteusz Fionik, ethnographer
- Ignacy Fonberg, chemist
- Marta Gryko, actress
- Father Leon Knabit, Benedictine priest
- Cezary Kosiński, actor
- Józef Lewartowski, activist
- Kamila Lićwinko, high jumper, gold medallist at the 2014 World Indoor Athletics Championships
- Josif Łangbard, Belarusian architect
- Sawa Palmowski, Orthodox cleric, a hegumen, and the superior of the Monastery of St. Nicholas in Bielsk Podlaski
- Jerzy Plutowicz, poet
- Małgorzata Prokopiuk-Kępka, journalist
- Maciej Radel, actor
- Kamila Stepaniuk, athlete
- Rościsław Stepaniuk, pilot
- Captain Władysław Wysocki, recipient of the Virtuti Militari and Hero of the Soviet Union
- Mina Bern (1911–2010); Yiddish theatre actress
- Zoja Saczko, poet
- Antoni Stalewski, recipient of the Virtuti Militari
- Aryeh Leib Yellin, Rabbi
- Zofia Sara Syrkin-Binsztejnowa, Polish-Jewish doctor and social activist

== Gallery ==
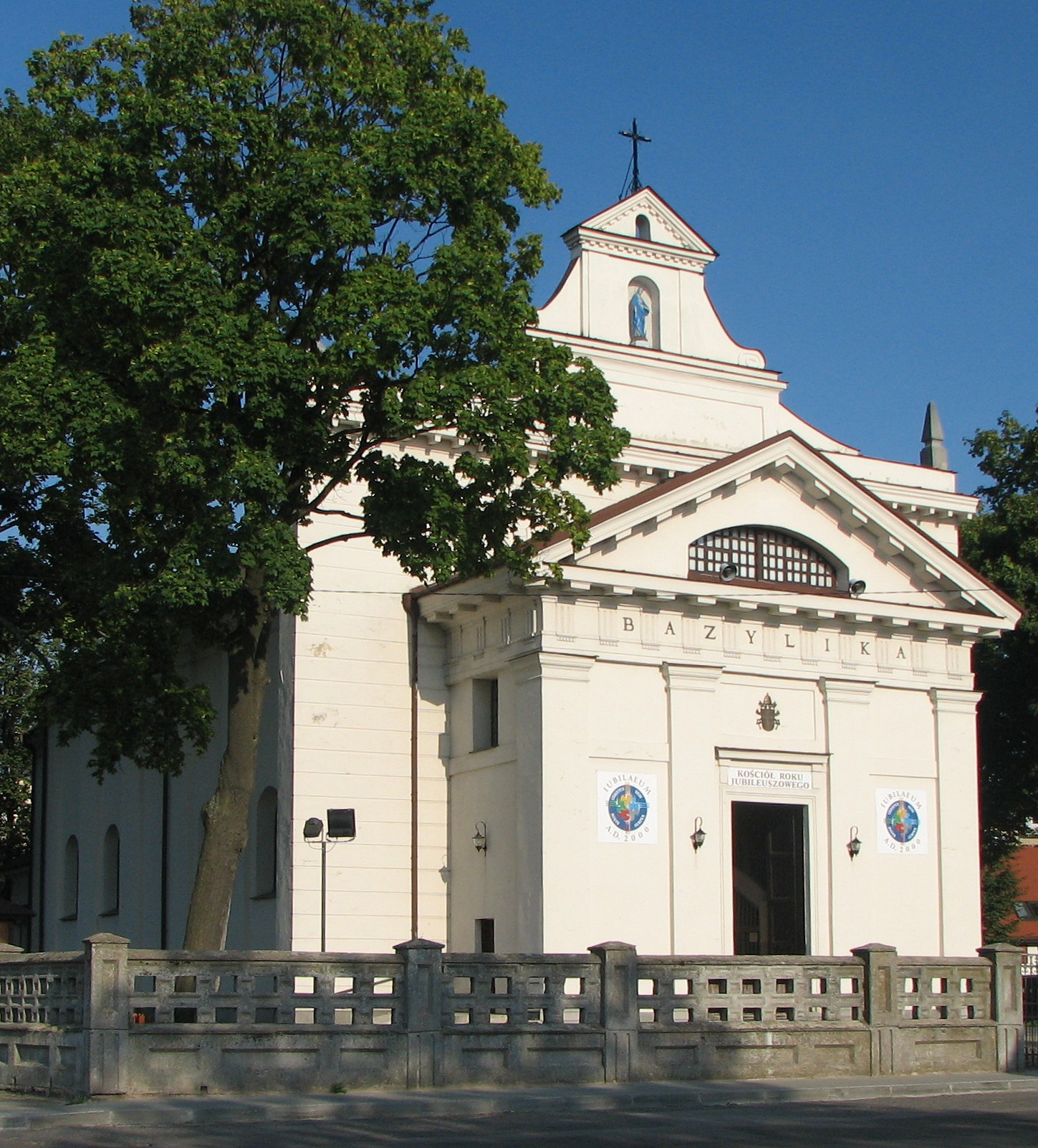
Catholic Basilica of Saints Mary and Nicholas

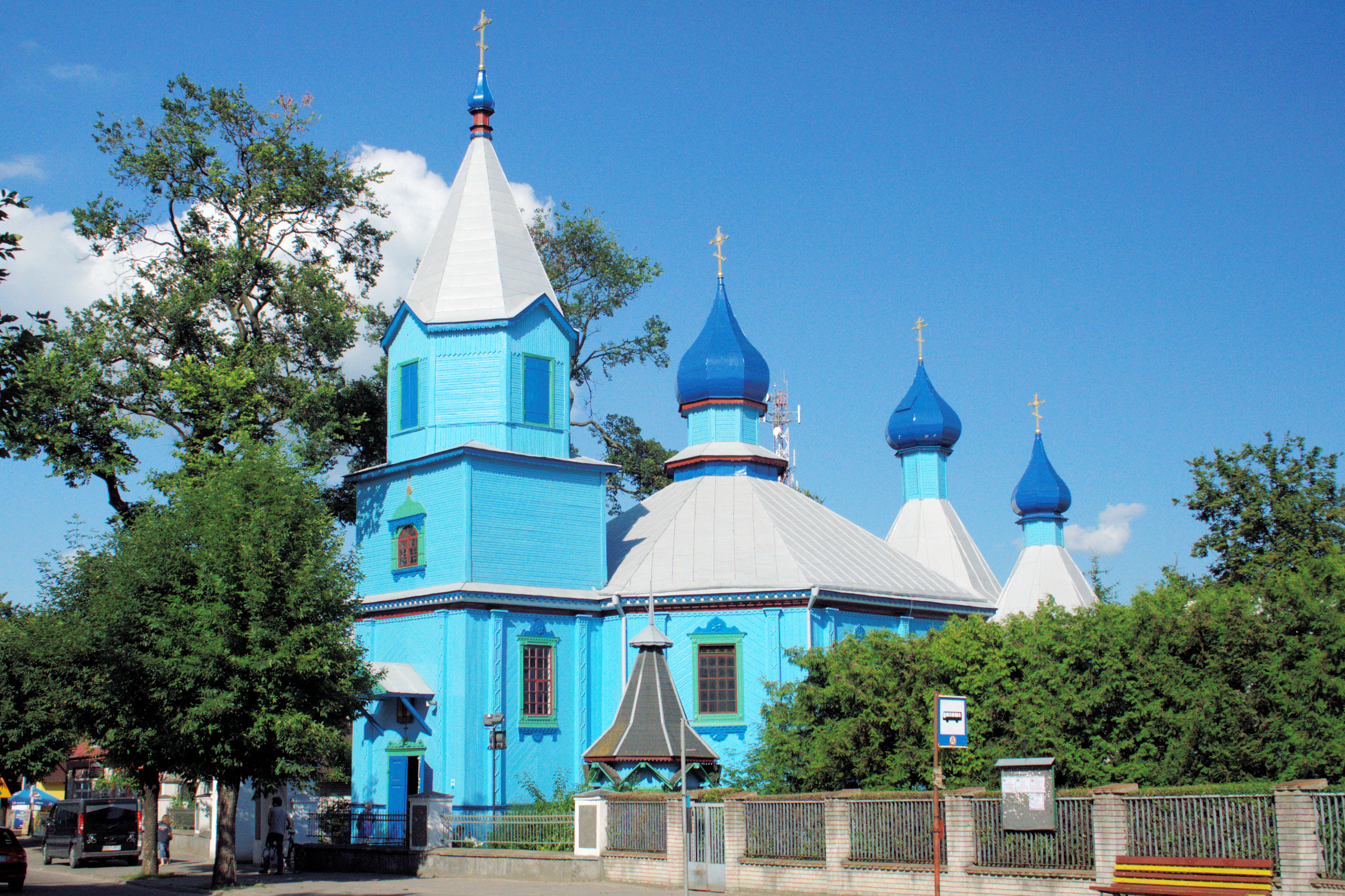
Orthodox church of the Assumption of the Archangel Michael

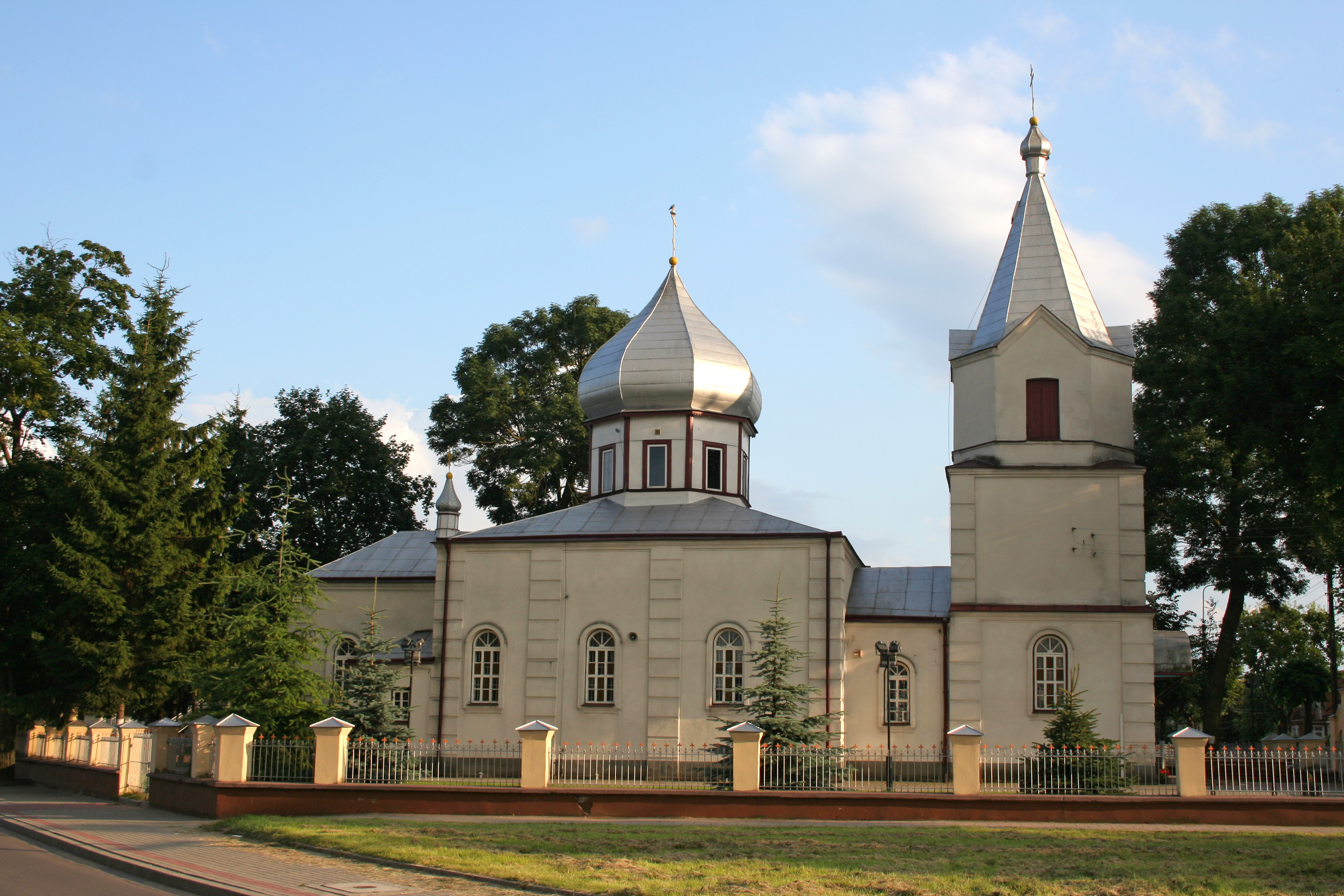
Orthodox Cathedral of the Lord's Resurrection

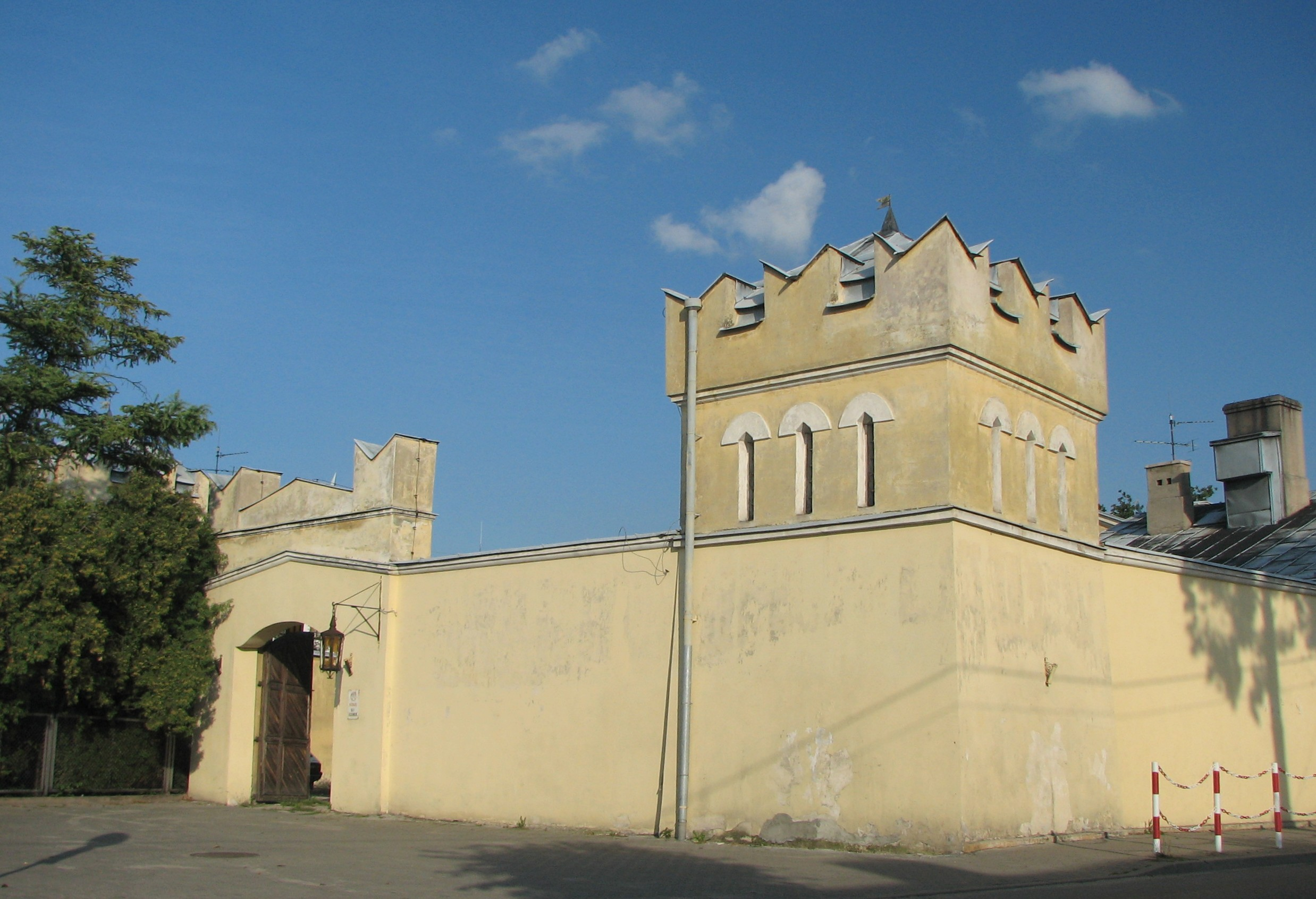
Former monastic building complex. Now the School of Music

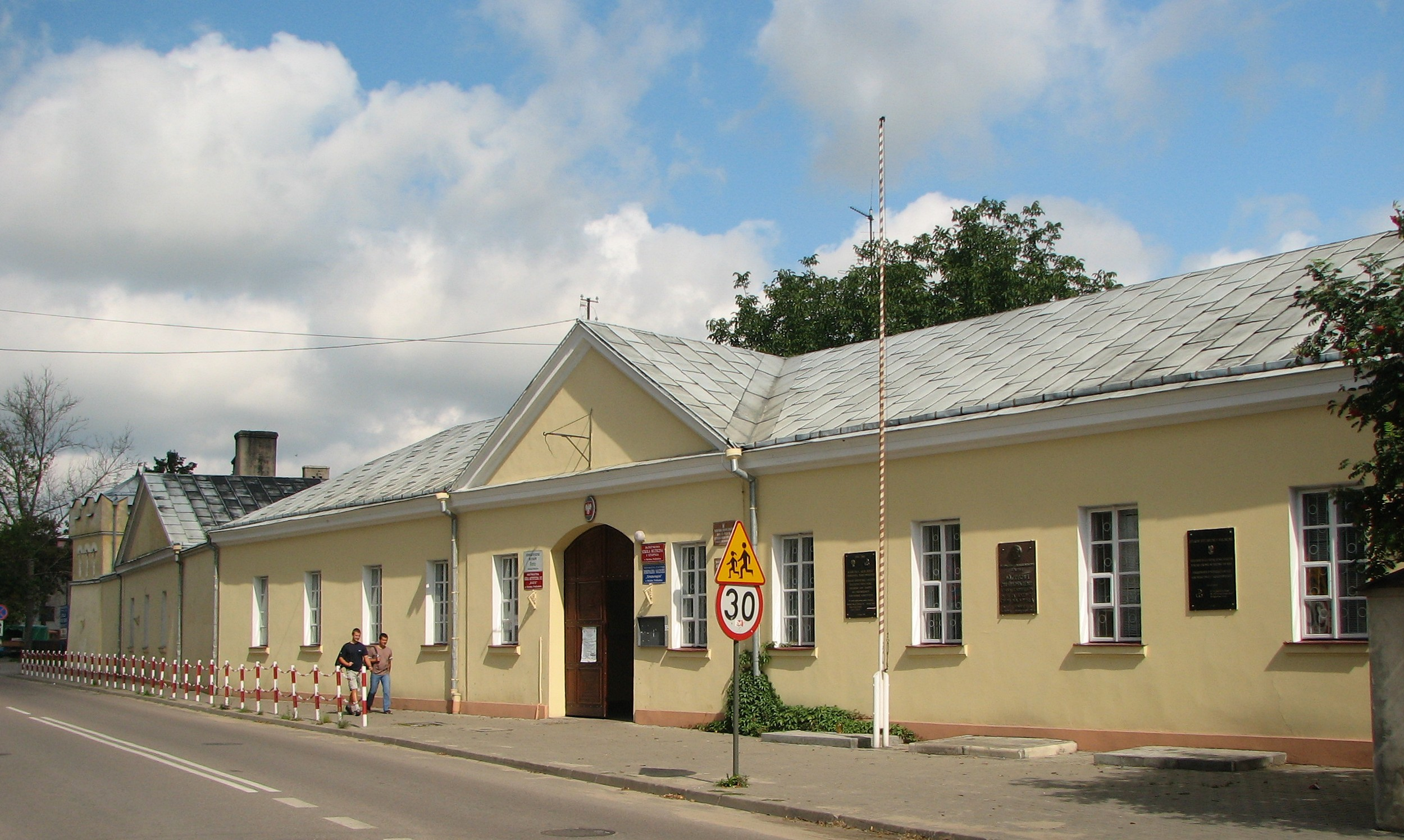
Former monastic building complex. Now the School of Music

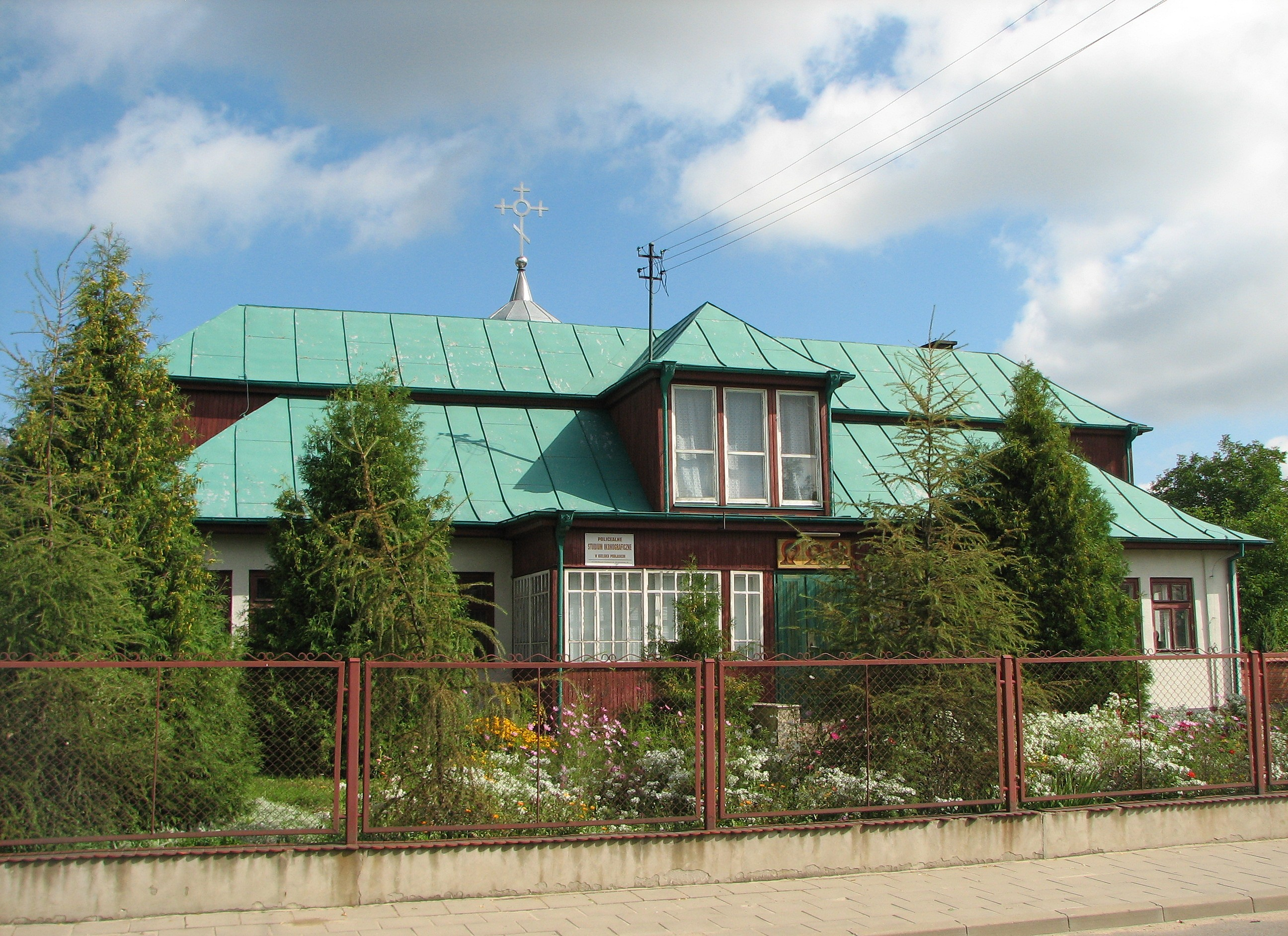
Iconographic school in Bielsk Podlaski

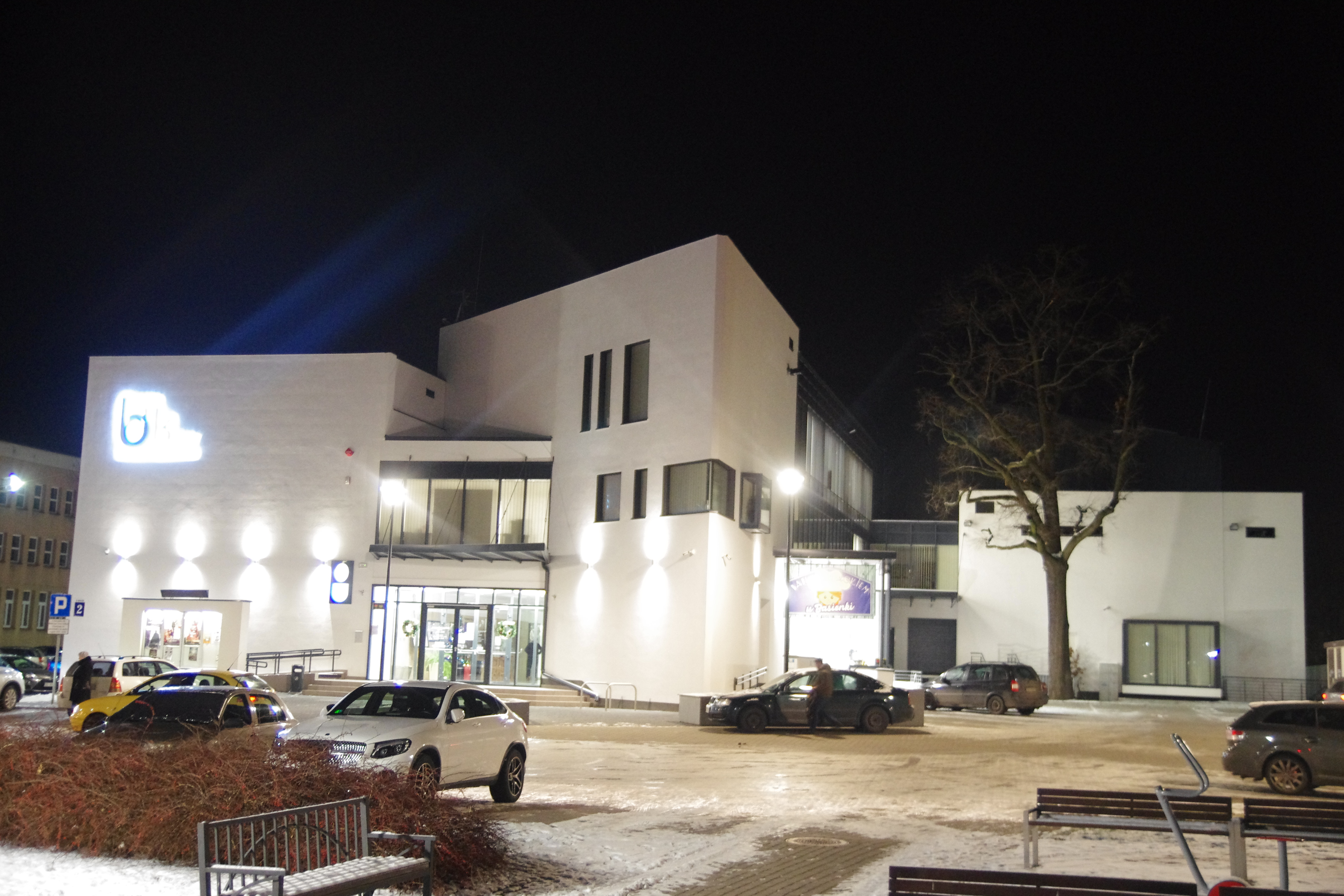
House of Culture
