= Mirosław Car =

Polish footballer (1960–2013)

Personal information
- Date of birth: 24 November 1960
- Place of birth: Bielsk Podlaski, Poland
- Date of death: 7 June 2013 (aged 52)
- Place of death: Białystok, Poland
- Height: 1.75 m (5 ft 9 in)
- Positions: Defender; midfielder

Youth career
- Tur Bielsk Podlaski

Senior career*
Years	Team	Apps	(Gls)
1982	Legia Warsaw	1	(0)
1983–1985	Motor Lublin		
1985–1988	Jagiellonia Białystok		
1990	Tur Bielsk Podlaski		
1993–1994	LZS Piliki		
- * Club domestic league appearances and goals

Mirosław Car (24 November 1960 – 7 June 2013) was a Polish professional footballer who played as a defender or midfielder.

== Biography ==
Car started his football career in 1978 with Tur Bielsk Podlaski, remaining at the club for three seasons. Later he was transferred to Legia Warsaw, where he played two seasons, winning the Polish Cup with the club in 1981. After leaving Legia, Car played for Motor Lublin for three seasons, before being sold to Jagiellonia Białystok, where he remained for three seasons, finishing second in the II liga with the club. After he left Jagiellonia, he returned to Tur Bielsk Podlaski, before retiring in 1990.

== Death ==
On 7 June 2013, Car died at the age of 52.
