= Konrad Kaczmarek =

Polish footballer

Personal information
- Full name: Konrad Kaczmarek
- Date of birth: 1 March 1991 (age 35)
- Place of birth: Głogów, Poland
- Height: 1.81 m (5 ft 11 1/2 in)
- Position: Forward

Team information
- Current team: Sparta Przedmoście

Youth career
- UKS SP Głogów
- Chrobry Głogów

Senior career*
Years	Team	Apps	(Gls)
2009–2013	Chrobry Głogów	74	(14)
2012–2013	→ ŁKS Łódź (loan)	20	(3)
2013–2014	KS Polkowice	7	(3)
2014	Olimpia Grudziądz	9	(1)
2014–2016	Śląsk Wrocław	15	(0)
2014–2016	Śląsk Wrocław II	29	(11)
2016–2019	Chrobry Głogów	58	(9)
2022–	Sparta Przedmoście		
- * Club domestic league appearances and goals as of 21:23, 22 June 2023 (UTC)

Konrad Kaczmarek (born 1 March 1991) is a Polish footballer who plays as a forward for Sparta Przedmoście.

== Honours ==
Chrobry Głogów

- III liga Lower Silesian–Lubusz: 2010–11

Individual

- Polish Cup top scorer: 2018–19
