= Adam Radecki =

Polish footballer

Personal information
- Date of birth: 18 March 1994 (age 32)
- Place of birth: Białystok, Poland
- Height: 1.85 m (6 ft 1 in)
- Position: Defender

Team information
- Current team: Olimpia Zambrów
- Number: 15

Youth career
- 2009: MOSP Jagiellonia Białystok

Senior career*
Years	Team	Apps	(Gls)
2010–2013	Jagiellonia Białystok (ME)	38	(0)
2013–2017	Jagiellonia Białystok II	100	(0)
2011–2014	Jagiellonia Białystok	2	(0)
2017–2018	Tur Bielsk Podlaski	31	(0)
2018–	Olimpia Zambrów	81+	(4)
- * Club domestic league appearances and goals as of 18 March 2024

Adam Radecki (born 18 March 1994) is a Polish professional footballer who plays for Olimpia Zambrów as a defender.

== Club career ==
He made his Ekstraklasa debut on 3 April 2011 in a 2–0 defeat to Wisła Kraków.
