= Sawa Palmowski =

Polish Orthodox cleric and reformer

Sawa
- Born: Palmowski
- Died: 1797; Bielsk Podlaski, Poland
- Education: Kyiv-Mohyla Academy

Ecclesiastical career
- Religion: Eastern Orthodoxy
- Church: Russian Orthodox Church
- Ordained: Before 1786
- Offices held: Superior of St. Nicholas Monastery in Bielsk Podlaski (1789–1793); Chairman of the Supreme Consistory of the Orthodox Church in the Polish–Lithuanian Commonwealth (1791–1793)
- Title: Hegumen

Sawa (secular surname Palmowski; died 1797) was an Orthodox cleric of the Polish–Lithuanian Commonwealth, a hegumen, and the superior of the Monastery of St. Nicholas in Bielsk Podlaski. He served as chairman of the Supreme Consistory of the Orthodox Church in the Commonwealth from 1791 to 1793. Sawa was the primary author of an unrealised reform project for the internal structure of the Orthodox Church, which aimed to sever ties with the Russian Orthodox Church. The plan was thwarted due to the Partitions of Poland.

== Biography ==
=== Early life and career ===
Sawa was the son of Tichon Palmowski, an Orthodox priest from Slutsk. According to Bishop Viktor Sadkovsky, Sawa had three brothers who were also Orthodox clerics. One of them, Eustachy, like Sawa, graduated from the Kyiv-Mohyla Academy and later became the superior of the Brotherhood Monastery.

The intellectual formation Sawa received at the Kyiv-Mohyla Academy, combined with his religious upbringing, significantly shaped his later views and actions. After completing his studies, he was appointed superior of the Holy Trinity Monastery in Pochep, attaining the rank of hegumen before its closure in 1786. Following the monastery's dissolution, he joined the Monastery of the Epiphany in Kyiv, led by his brother. With his brother's support, Sawa sought a nomination from church authorities to lead another monastery with a vacant superior position. In 1787, he met Bishop Viktor of Pereiaslav, who had been the de facto head of Orthodox structures in the Commonwealth for two years, in Korsun. Sawa expressed his willingness to relocate to the Commonwealth to lead one of its remaining Orthodox monasteries. Due to Bishop Viktor's illness, the move was delayed by two years. In 1788, Sawa received permission from Metropolitan Hilarion Kondratovsky of Novgorod-Seversky to transfer to pastoral service in another diocese. On 1 March 1789, he was appointed superior of the Monastery of St. Nicholas in Bielsk Podlaski.

=== Hegumen of the Bielsk monastery ===
In spring 1789, Bishop Viktor of Pereiaslav was accused of inciting peasant uprisings in Volhynia and Podolia, allegedly in collusion with Russia. Similar accusations were soon levelled against the entire Orthodox clergy in the Commonwealth, despite the Slutsk starosta, acting on orders from Prince Michał Hieronim Radziwiłł, confirming that Bishop Viktor had not issued any pastoral letter inciting rebellion against the Commonwealth. Nevertheless, on 21 April 1789, Marshal Kazimierz Nestor Sapieha declared in the Sejm that Orthodox priests were instigating pro-Russian and anti-state peasant revolts. Eight days later, Bishop Viktor was arrested and detained in Nyasvizh. The clergy under his authority were required to swear an oath of loyalty to the Commonwealth. Most priests refused to take the oath. Hegumen Sawa Palmowski also refused twice, but fearing legal consequences, he eventually swore the oath on the third attempt, alongside four other monks from the Bielsk monastery.

A special Sejm commission investigated Bishop Viktor's case. On 29 March 1790, despite lacking conclusive evidence, it formally charged the hierarch with treason. The commission also proposed broader measures regarding the legal and canonical status of Orthodox residents in the Commonwealth. To prevent future scenarios where Orthodox bishops in the Commonwealth were subordinate to Russian authorities, it recommended issuing a universal decree to the Orthodox community, instructing them to organise a council. This council was to draft a new internal statute for the Orthodox Church in Poland, ensuring its autonomy. Orthodox bishops in the Commonwealth were to acknowledge the authority of the Ecumenical Patriarchate of Constantinople once again. The Sejm and the king approved the commission's recommendations. On 9 October 1790, Sejm marshals Stanisław Małachowski and Kazimierz Sapieha instructed the Orthodox community to elect representatives to a commission that would prepare for the council, set to convene in Warsaw from December 1790. At the same time, Hegumen Sawa was personally invited by the marshals to participate in the commission's work. The likely reason for this special treatment was the belief among Polish political elites in Sawa's loyalty to the Commonwealth. Sawa may have demonstrated this loyalty during a visit to Warsaw in June 1789, when he was denied access to the imprisoned Bishop Viktor but likely met with state officials. Sawa began drafting detailed Orthodox demands to the Commonwealth government, organising a clergy assembly in Slutsk later that year for this purpose.

On 1 March 1791, the Sejm commission submitted a report on the state of Orthodoxy in Poland, describing its situation as dire, even tragic. Based on the commission's findings, the Sejm passed a constitution on 5 March concerning the "Greek-Oriental religion", recognising the need to reorganise the clerical hierarchy and establish a permanent governing body for the Orthodox Church in the Commonwealth. Simultaneously, Orthodox commission members, led by Hegumen Sawa, called on their co-religionists to elect delegates to a congress scheduled for 15 May 1791 in Pinsk. The congress was ultimately postponed by a month. Sawa Palmowski was elected as a delegate for the Bielsk monastery and the town and commune of Opatów.

==== Participation in the Pinsk Congress ====
On the second day of the Pinsk Congress, Hegumen Sawa was elected to its presidium as one of 11 assessors. On 2 July, a temporary body to manage the Orthodox Church in Poland, the Supreme Consistory, was established. It was tasked with overseeing the church until the hierarchy could be restored, with plans to create four dioceses and consecrate four bishops. Hegumen Sawa was appointed chairman of the Supreme Consistory. This act effectively established an autocephalous Orthodox Church in the Commonwealth, denying the Russian Orthodox Church any authority over Orthodox structures in the Commonwealth.

=== Chairman of the Supreme Consistory ===
On 8 July 1791, the Supreme Consistory, led by Hegumen Sawa, informed Orthodox clergy and laity that it had assumed control over church structures. The following day, it required priests to pledge loyalty to the Commonwealth and instructed them to discontinue using Russian catechisms. On 9 December, the Consistory addressed monastery superiors, directing them to provide religious education for all faithful, establish parish schools, maintain accurate sacramental records, and financially support the supreme church body. The Consistory remained loyal to the imprisoned Bishop Viktor of Pereiaslav, who was regularly commemorated in prayers. However, Hegumen Sawa was considered the leading candidate to become the future head of the Church in the Commonwealth. Bielsk was designated as the seat of the church's leader, who was to hold the rank of metropolitan.

Bishop Viktor of Pereiaslav strongly disapproved of Sawa Palmowski's activities and the Consistory he led. During interrogations by the Sejm commission, he accused the hegumen of both canonical violations and common crimes. The Most Holy Synod shared this view. Ultimately, the full implementation of the Pinsk Congress' resolutions was prevented by the Second Partition of Poland. Released in 1792, Bishop Viktor initially demanded that Sawa return from Warsaw to Bielsk. Sawa refused multiple times, escalating the conflict between the two clerics. On 24 February 1793, Bishop Viktor ordered Sawa to leave the Diocese of Minsk, and to surrender the Supreme Consistory's documentation. Sawa left Bielsk before 14 March 1793, when Bishop Viktor appointed Sofronius, previously the hegumen of the Monastery of the Dormition of the Mother of God in Zabłudów, as the new superior of the St. Nicholas Monastery in Bielsk. Sawa relocated to Warsaw.

=== During the Kościuszko Uprising ===
At the outbreak of the Kościuszko Uprising, Sawa was still in Warsaw. The insurgent government appointed him chaplain to Russian Orthodox prisoners of war, providing a one-time payment of 6,000 PLN. After the establishment of the Supreme National Council by Tadeusz Kościuszko, Sawa was named one of its 18 deputy members. The insurgent government also permitted the Supreme Consistory to resume its activities with its original composition, which it did until the uprising's collapse. Kościuszko personally approved the establishment of an Orthodox chapel in Warsaw, a cause Sawa championed. Sawa secured 4,700 PLN from the Insurrection's Treasury Department to organise the chapel.

Following the uprising's defeat, when Orthodox structures in Polish lands were fully subordinated to the Russian Orthodox Church, the Supreme Consistory was dissolved. The fate of its chairman remains unclear. He was likely sent to a Russian monastery and isolated, preventing further activity. Some sources suggest Sawa returned to the Monastery of St. Nicholas in Bielsk and died there after 1797.

== Bibliography ==
- Mironowicz, Antoni (2001). Ihumen Sawa Palmowski [Hegumen Sawa Palmowski] (in Polish). Białystok: Main Board of the Orthodox Brotherhood of Saints Cyril and Methodius. ISBN 83-902928-7-4.
- Pawluczuk, U. (2010). "Działalność polityczna i społeczna Sawy Palmowskiego" [Political and Social Activities of Sawa Palmowski]. Latopisy Akademii Supraskiej [Annals of the Suprasl Academy] (in Polish). Vol. 1. Białystok: Orthdruk. ISBN 978-83-922907-1-1.
- Mironowicz, Antoni (2008). Diecezja białoruska w XVII i XVIII wieku [The Belarusian Diocese in the 17th and 18th Centuries] (in Polish). Białystok: University of Białystok Press. ISBN 978-83-7431-150-2.
