= Tur Bielsk Podlaski =

- Full name: Bielski Klub Sportowy Tur Bielsk Podlaski
- Founded: 1923; 102 years ago
- Stadium: MOSiR Stadium
- Capacity: 1,500
- Coordinates: 52°45′22″N 23°10′57″E
- Chairman: Karol Car
- Manager: Dariusz Szklarzewski
- League: IV liga Podlasie
- 2023–24: IV liga Podlasie, 5th of 18

Tur Bielsk Podlaski is a Polish multi-sports club located in Bielsk Podlaski, which was founded in 1923. As of 2024, its basketball team plays in II Liga and its football team plays in IV liga Podlasie.

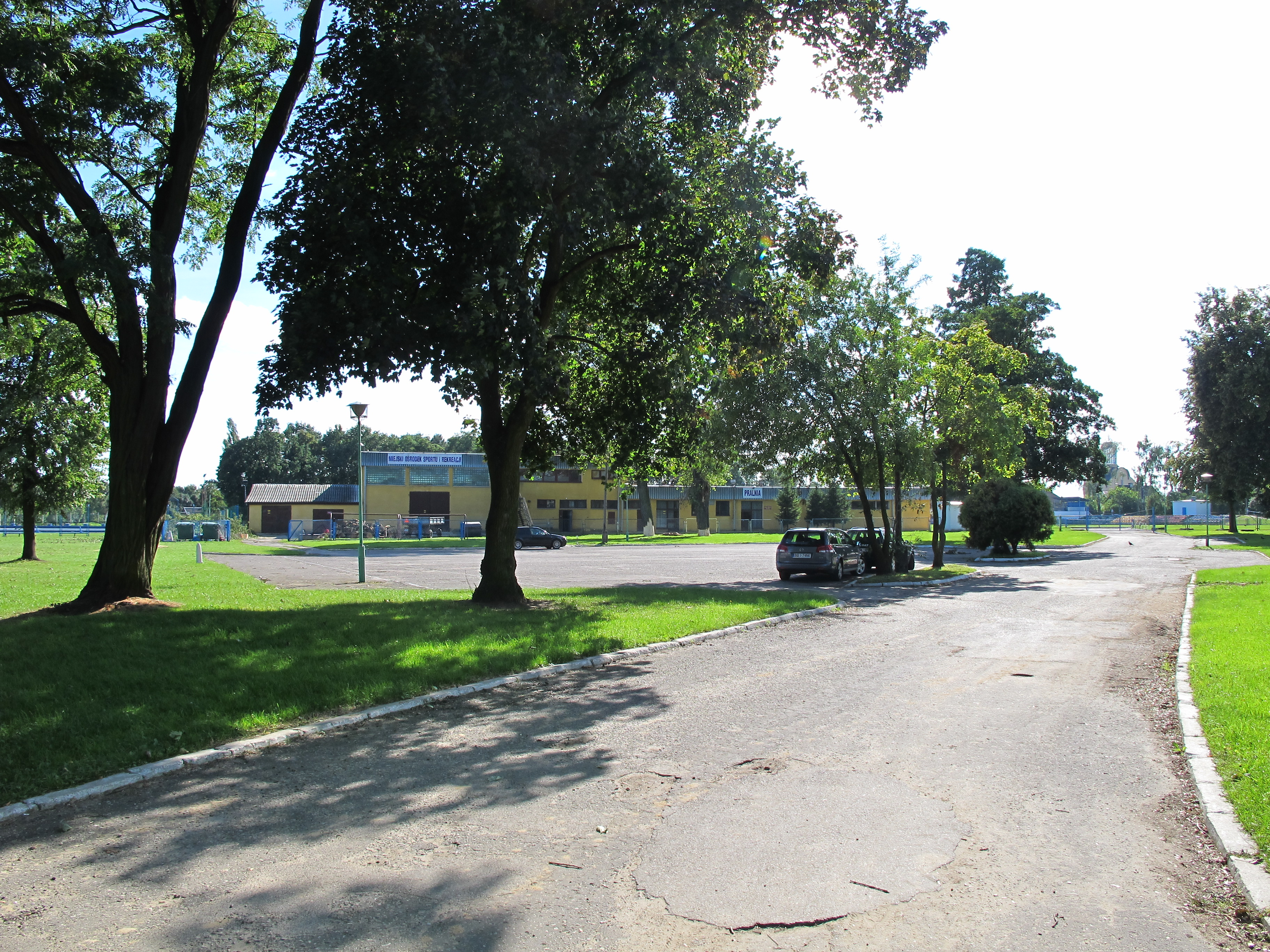
Tur Bielsk Podlaski's stadium
