= Trzaska coat of arms =

Polish coat of arms

Trzaska
- Battle cry: Biała
- Alternative names: Biała, Lubiewa, Lubiewo, Trzeska
- Earliest mention: 1396
- Towns: none
- Families: 161 names altogether: Balukiewicz, Bałukiewicz, Betko, Białostocki, Biały, Bielecki, Bielski, Błażejewski, Błażejowski, Błażewski, Bogusz, Brunowski, Buczkiewicz, Buczkoewicz, Buczkowicz, Budkiewicz, Butkiewicz, Chasco, Chojnacki, Chojniski, Choromański, Choynacki, Chrząszczewski, Chrzczonowski, Cierzpięta, Ciskowski, Ciszkowski, Czarnołęski, Czasko, Czusołowicz, Czusułowicz, Dłuski, Drężeński, Droszacki, Drozdowicz, Drożecki, Drożewski, Dubrski, Dudkiewicz, Durbski, Durpski, Durski, Dutkiewicz, Dziedzina, Filipkowski, Filuński, Fil, Filut, Filutowski, Glinicki, Glinka, Goliniński, Goliński, Gołuchowski, Gołyński, Gutowski, Janczewski Glinka, Jarzyna, Jarzyński, Kleczkowski, Knoll, Konopacki, Kotowski, Kotutawicz, Kotutewicz, Kotwicki, Krajewski, Kufałowicz, Kurnoch, Kurnochowski, Lubiejewski, Lubiewski, Luśnia, Łapiński, Łukowicz, Łyczkowski, Mejszer, Meydalon, Mgorowski, Michalski, Michałowski, Miłocki, Mokowski, Nagórka, Nagórski, Nartow, Nartowski, Nartowt, Niemierowski, Niemirowski, Otwocki, Palmowski, Pancerzyński, Papleński, Papliński, Pątkowski, Pielasz, Podbielski, Podsędkowski, Polaczek, Ponikiewski, Popławski, Poszyliński, Przychodzki, Rojecki, Rojewski, Rotowski, Rycicki, Ryczycki, Rykaczewski, Schabelski, Sczucki, Sieklucki, Słupecki, Sobiesand, Sokołowski, Szczucki, Szwejkowsk, Szwejkowski, Szygowski, Szygowski na Szygach, Szypulski, Świecikowski, Świejko, Świejkowski, Świeykowski, Tarchomiński, Truskowski, Truszkowski, Trzaska, Trzaskacz, Trzasko-Durski, Trzaskowski, Trzonkowski, Trzonowski, Trzśskowski, Tymczenko, Tyski, Tyszczenko, Tyszka, Wawrzykowski, Wawrzyszewski, Wendrogowski, Wędrogowski, Wieluński, Wilewski, Wileziński, Wiszniewski, Wiśniewski, Włoszczewski, Włoszczowski, Wolszleger, Wołkanowski, Wycbieszyński, Wyleżeński, Wyleżyński, Zabielski, Zakrzewski, Zakrzowski, Zastruski, Zimoszarski, Zorawski, Żórawski, Żurawski

Trzaska is a Polish coat of arms. It was used by several szlachta families in the times of the Polish–Lithuanian Commonwealth.

== History ==
During a battle around the turn of the eleventh century, enemy forces rushed towards King Boleslaw I The Brave of Poland. One of the King's knights rushed to the aid of the king, but as he struck the enemy his sword broke near hilt. The King gave the knight his sword, with which the knight fought off the enemy, but near the end of the fight, that sword too broke near the hilt. After the battle, the knight returned the sword to King Boleslaw. For his courage, the knight received a shield from the King exhibiting two broken swords and a crescent moon.

The house name Trzaska (root word Polish: "trzaskać". Trzaska literally means, he who hits hard or slams. The name was given to the knight after the king noticed the powerful blows that broke both the knight's swords and the enemies shields.

The King also gave the knight a monastery in Lublin, where members of the knight's house ruled the abbots for three generations. The monastery to this day uses the Trzaska shields as its seal. The alternate names for Trzaska (Lubiewa and Lubiewo) are derived from the name of Lublin, a city in Lesser Poland.

== Blazon ==
"Azure, two swords Argent in pale hilted and pommeled Or, conjoined at the blade's midpoint and debruised of a crescent at a fess point, also Or. For a crest, a panache of peacock plumes, all proper, charged with the arms of the shield." There is a new moon, as it were, not full, with both ends upward, yellow in a blue field, and two chipped sword pommels with crosses and hilts, of which one is in the middle of the moon, and the other beneath it. On a helmet above a crown is a peacock's tail, with the same moon and pommels.

Note: That is how Paprocki described it in his Gniazdo cnoty (Nest of Virtue), pages 45 and 1187, and in O herbach (Of Clan Shields), page 265; also Okolski in vol.3, page 240, and in Klejnoty (Crests), page 87.

== Notable bearers ==
Notable bearers of this coat of arms include:

- Agenor Gołuchowski (father)
- Agenor Maria Gołuchowski

== See also ==
- Polish heraldry
- Heraldry
- Coat of arms
