= Chojane =

Chojane may refer to several villages in the administrative district of Gmina Kulesze Kościelne, within Wysokie Mazowieckie County, Podlaskie Voivodeship, in north-eastern Poland:

- Chojane-Bąki
- Chojane-Gorczany
- Chojane-Pawłowięta
- Chojane-Piecki
- Chojane-Sierocięta
- Chojane-Stankowięta
