= Bruszewo-Borkowizna =

- Village
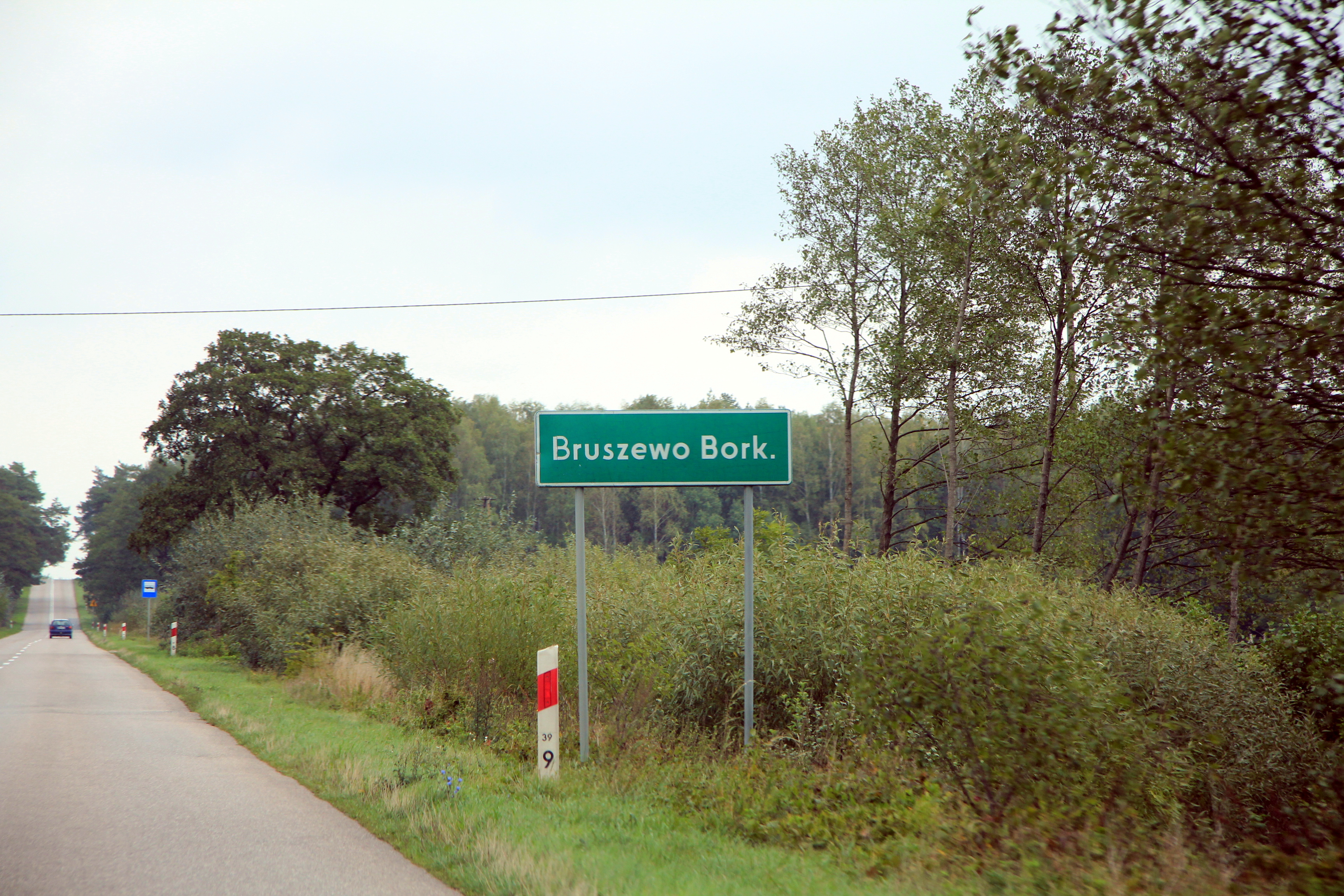

- Location within Poland
- Coordinates: 52°58′46″N 22°40′34″E
- Country: Poland
- Voivodeship: Podlaskie
- County: Wysokie Mazowieckie
- Gmina: Sokoły
- Population: 25
- Postal code: 18-218
- Car plates: BWM

Bruszewo-Borkowizna [bruˈʂɛvɔ bɔrkɔˈvizna] is a village in the administrative district of Gmina Sokoły, within Wysokie Mazowieckie County, Podlaskie Voivodeship, in north-eastern Poland.

In 1975-1998, the village belonged administratively to Łomża Voivideship.

The faithful of the Roman Catholic Church belong to the parish of the Assumption of the Blessed Virgin Mary in Sokoly.

== History ==
In 1921, the village of Bruszewo and the settlement of Borkowizna were specified. There was a total of 80 residential buildings and 423 inhabitants. Polish nationality was declared by 422 people and 1 other.

== Transport ==
Voivodeship road No. 678 (Wysokie Mazowieckie - Białystok) runs through the village. The village is situated 2 km (1 mi) from Sokoły, the capital of the Sokoły commune, and 13 km (8 mi) from Wysokie Mazowieckie. There is also the Bruszewo - Bujny road nearby.

== See also ==
- Bruszewo
