= Wykno =

Wykno may refer to the following places:

- Wykno, Piotrków County in Łódź Voivodeship (central Poland)
- Wykno, Gmina Będków in Łódź Voivodeship (central Poland)
- Wykno, Gmina Ujazd in Łódź Voivodeship (central Poland)
- Idźki-Wykno, a village in Wysokie Mazowieckie County, Podlaskie Voivodeship (eastern Poland)
- Stare Wykno, a village in Wysokie Mazowieckie County, Podlaskie Voivodeship (eastern Poland)
- Nowe Wykno, a village in Wysokie Mazowieckie County, Podlaskie Voivodeship (eastern Poland)
- Gromadzyn-Wykno, a village in Kolno County, Podlaskie Voivodeship (eastern Poland)
