= Faszcze =

Faszcze may refer to the following places:

- Faszcze, Gmina Kulesze Kościelne in Podlaskie Voivodeship (north-east Poland)
- Faszcze, Gmina Wysokie Mazowieckie in Podlaskie Voivodeship (north-east Poland)
- Faszcze, Warmian-Masurian Voivodeship (north Poland)
