= Tybory Uszyńskie =

- Village
- Location within Poland
- Coordinates: 52°58′48″N 22°25′20″E
- Country: Poland
- Voivodeship: Podlaskie
- County: Wysokie Mazowieckie
- Gmina: Kulesze Kościelne

Tybory Uszyńskie [tɨˈbɔrɨ uˈʂɨɲskʲɛ] is a village in the administrative district of Gmina Kulesze Kościelne, within Wysokie Mazowieckie County, Podlaskie Voivodeship, in north-eastern Poland.

== History ==
The village was probably founded in the 15th century. Joanne et Stanislao de Uszyńskie were mentioned during the establishment of the parish in Kulesze Kościelne. The village was inhabited by members of the Uszyński noble family of the Lubicz coat of arms.

It formed part of the szlachta settlement area of Tybory, which included villages belonging to the parishes of Jabłonka Kościelna and Kulesze, as well as the municipalities of Chojany, Dzięciel and Szepietowo.

In 1827, the village had 7 houses and 35 inhabitants. At the end of the 19th century, it belonged to the municipality of Chojane and the parish of Kulesze Kościelne.

At the end of the 19th century, the village had 12 smallholders of noble origin, who owned a total of 276 hectares of land. The average farm had an area of 23 hectares.

In 1921, the village had 15 houses and 86 inhabitants.

== School ==
In 1922, the village's one-class public school had 46 pupils, increasing to 84 in 1923. From 1924, it was a two-class school and had 96 pupils. The number of pupils was 97 in 1925, 97 in 1930, 86 in 1931, and 72 in 1938.

Teachers included Wanda Florianówna and Genowefa Kuleszanka (1925), Eugenia Wiśniowska (1928–1929), Edmund Pawłowski (1935), and Melchior Radziszewski and Włodzimierz Szejnoga (1938).
