= Pezy =

Pezy may refer to:

Places

- Pęzy, a village in the administrative district of Gmina Sokoły, within Wysokie Mazowieckie County, Podlaskie Voivodeship, in north-eastern Poland
- Pézy, a former commune in the Eure-et-Loir department in northern France.

Other

- PEZY Computing, a japanese fabless computer chip design company
