= Niziołki-Dobki =

Village in Gmina Kulesze Kościelne, Poland

- Village
- Location within Poland
- Coordinates: 53°02′02″N 22°29′59″E
- Country: Poland
- Voivodeship: Podlaskie
- County: Wysokie Mazowieckie
- Gmina: Kulesze Kościelne

Niziołki-Dobki [niˈʑɔu̯ki ˈdɔpki] is a village in the administrative district of Gmina Kulesze Kościelne, within Wysokie Mazowieckie County, Podlaskie Voivodeship, in north-eastern Poland.
