= Kalinowo-Solki =

- Village
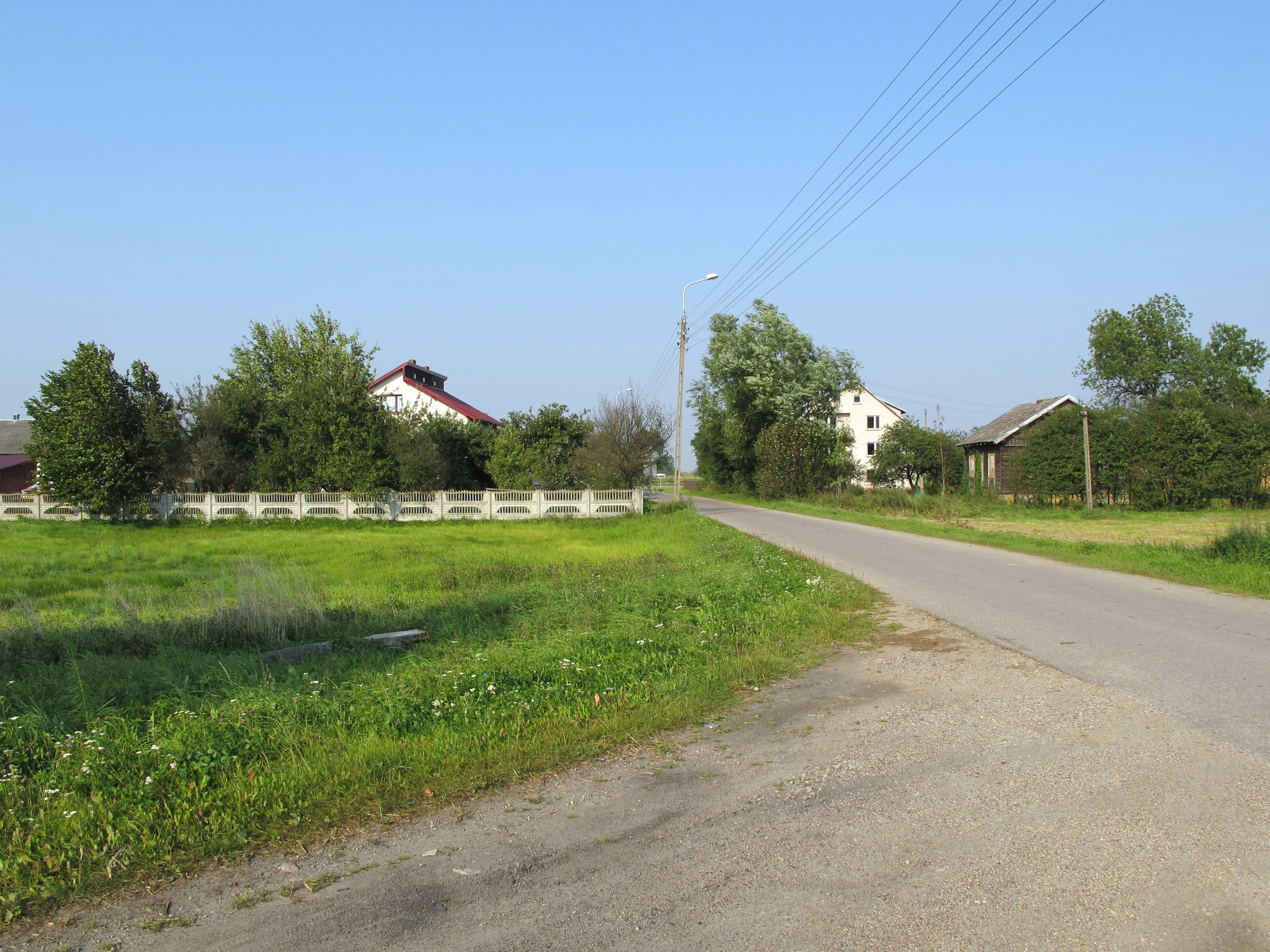

- Location within Poland
- Coordinates: 52°58′N 22°33′E
- Country: Poland
- Voivodeship: Podlaskie
- County: Wysokie Mazowieckie
- Gmina: Kulesze Kościelne
- Time zone: UTC+1 (CET)
  - Summer (DST): UTC+2 (CEST)

Kalinowo-Solki [kaliˈnɔvɔ ˈsɔlki] is a village in the administrative district of Gmina Kulesze Kościelne, within Wysokie Mazowieckie County, Podlaskie Voivodeship, in north-eastern Poland.

== History ==
Three Polish citizens were murdered by Nazi Germany in the village during World War II.
