= Jabłonowo-Kąty =

- Village
- Location within Poland
- Coordinates: 53°01′57″N 22°44′03″E
- Country: Poland
- Voivodeship: Podlaskie
- County: Wysokie Mazowieckie
- Gmina: Sokoły
- Time zone: UTC+1 (CET)
  - Summer (DST): UTC+2 (CEST)

Jabłonowo-Kąty [jabwɔˈnɔvɔ ˈkɔntɨ] is a village in the administrative district of Gmina Sokoły, within Wysokie Mazowieckie County, Podlaskie Voivodeship, in north-eastern Poland. According to the 2011 census, the population was 71.

== History ==
Three Polish citizens were murdered by Nazi Germany in the village during World War II.
