= Jamiołki-Piotrowięta =

- Village
- Location within Poland
- Coordinates: 53°0′N 22°39′E
- Country: Poland
- Voivodeship: Podlaskie
- County: Wysokie Mazowieckie
- Gmina: Sokoły
- Population: 120

Jamiołki-Piotrowięta [jaˈmjɔu̯ki pjɔtrɔˈvjɛnta] is a village in the administrative district of Gmina Sokoły, within Wysokie Mazowieckie County, Podlaskie Voivodeship, in north-eastern Poland.
