= Kowalewszczyzna-Folwark =

- Village
- Location within Poland
- Coordinates: 53°4′1″N 22°47′34″E
- Country: Poland
- Voivodeship: Podlaskie
- County: Wysokie Mazowieckie
- Gmina: Sokoły

Kowalewszczyzna-Folwark [kɔvalɛfʂˈt͡ʂɨzna ˈfɔlvark] is a village in the administrative district of Gmina Sokoły, within Wysokie Mazowieckie County, Podlaskie Voivodeship, in north-eastern Poland.
