= Perki-Karpie =

- Village
- Location within Poland
- Coordinates: 52°58′24″N 22°45′12″E
- Country: Poland
- Voivodeship: Podlaskie
- County: Wysokie Mazowieckie
- Gmina: Sokoły
- Population: 1,260

Perki-Karpie [ˈpɛrki ˈkarpjɛ] is a village in the administrative district of Gmina Sokoły, within Wysokie Mazowieckie County, Podlaskie Voivodeship, in north-eastern Poland.
