= Idźki Średnie =

- Village
- Location within Poland
- Coordinates: 53°1′N 22°43′E
- Country: Poland
- Voivodeship: Podlaskie
- County: Wysokie Mazowieckie
- Gmina: Sokoły

Idźki Średnie [ˈit͡ɕki ˈɕrɛdɲɛ] is a village in the administrative district of Gmina Sokoły, within Wysokie Mazowieckie County, Podlaskie Voivodeship, in north-eastern Poland.
