= Kruszewo-Wypychy =

- Village
- Location within Poland
- Coordinates: 52°59′05″N 22°43′05″E
- Country: Poland
- Voivodeship: Podlaskie
- County: Wysokie Mazowieckie
- Gmina: Sokoły

Kruszewo-Wypychy [kruˈʂɛvɔ vɨˈpɨxɨ] is a village in the administrative district of Gmina Sokoły, within Wysokie Mazowieckie County, Podlaskie Voivodeship, in north-eastern Poland.
