= Nowe Kalinowo =

- Village
- Location within Poland
- Coordinates: 52°58′47″N 22°34′39″E
- Country: Poland
- Voivodeship: Podlaskie
- County: Wysokie Mazowieckie
- Gmina: Kulesze Kościelne

Nowe Kalinowo [ˈnɔvɛ kaliˈnɔvɔ] is a village in the administrative district of Gmina Kulesze Kościelne, within Wysokie Mazowieckie County, Podlaskie Voivodeship, in north-eastern Poland.
