= Kulesze-Litewka =

- Village
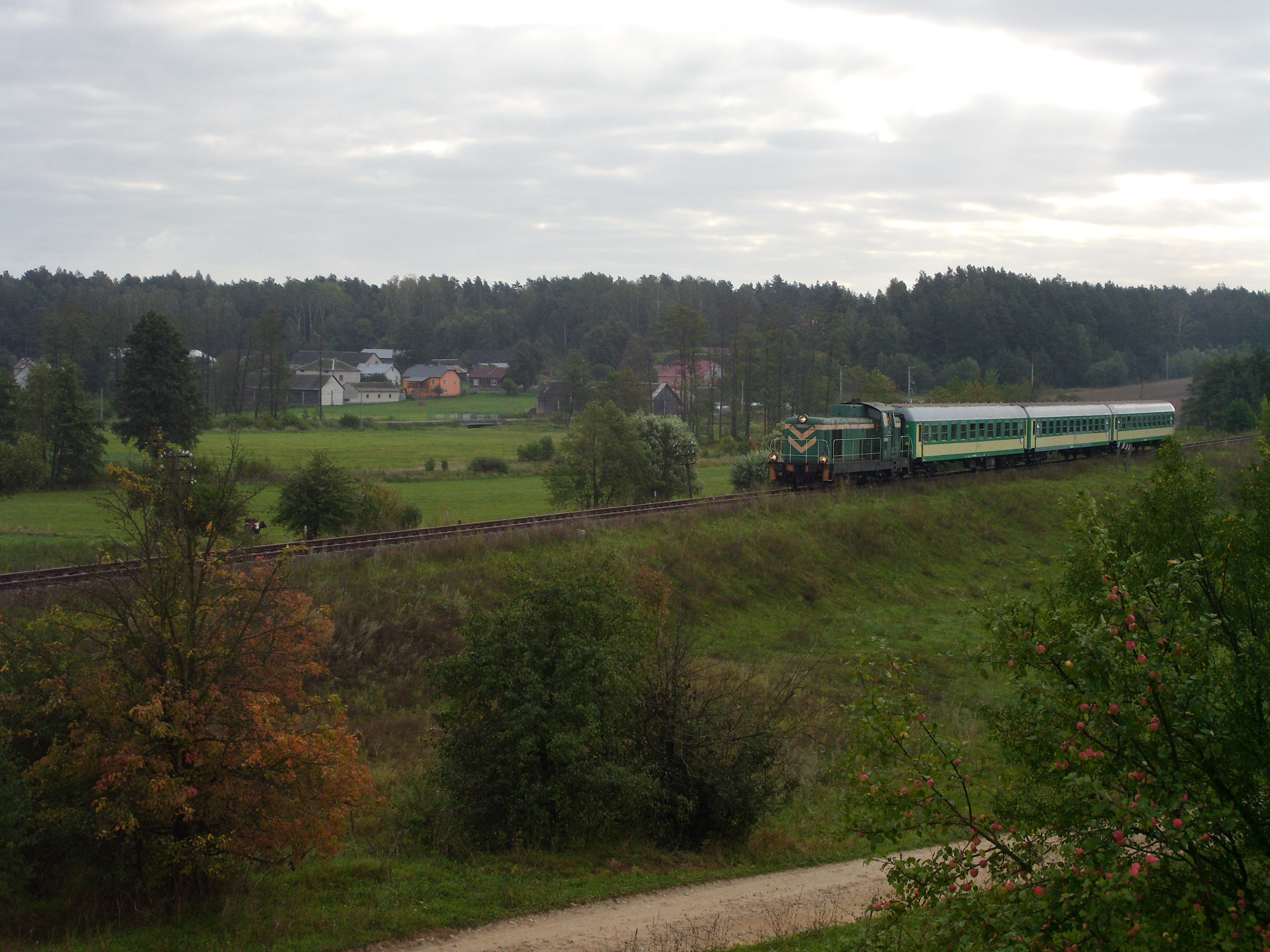
- Railway in Kulesze-Litewka

- Location within Poland
- Coordinates: 53°01′24″N 22°31′02″E
- Country: Poland
- Voivodeship: Podlaskie
- County: Wysokie Mazowieckie
- Gmina: Kulesze Kościelne

Kulesze-Litewka [kuˈlɛʂɛ liˈtɛfka] is a village in the administrative district of Gmina Kulesze Kościelne, within Wysokie Mazowieckie County, Podlaskie Voivodeship, in north-eastern Poland.
