= Stypułki-Giemzino =

- Village
- Location within Poland
- Coordinates: 53°1′3″N 22°37′13″E
- Country: Poland
- Voivodeship: Podlaskie
- County: Wysokie Mazowieckie
- Gmina: Kulesze Kościelne

Stypułki-Giemzino (Polish pronunciation: [stɨˈpuwkʲi ɡʲɛmˈʑinɔ]) is a village in the administrative district of Gmina Kulesze Kościelne, within Wysokie Mazowieckie County, Podlaskie Voivodeship, in north-eastern Poland.
