= Truskolasy-Olszyna =

- Village
- Location within Poland
- Coordinates: 53°01′28″N 22°42′09″E
- Country: Poland
- Voivodeship: Podlaskie
- County: Wysokie Mazowieckie
- Gmina: Sokoły
- Population: 200

Truskolasy-Olszyna [truskɔˈlasɨ ɔlˈʂɨna] is a village in the administrative district of Gmina Sokoły, within Wysokie Mazowieckie County, Podlaskie Voivodeship, in north-eastern Poland.
