= Gołasze Mościckie =

- Village
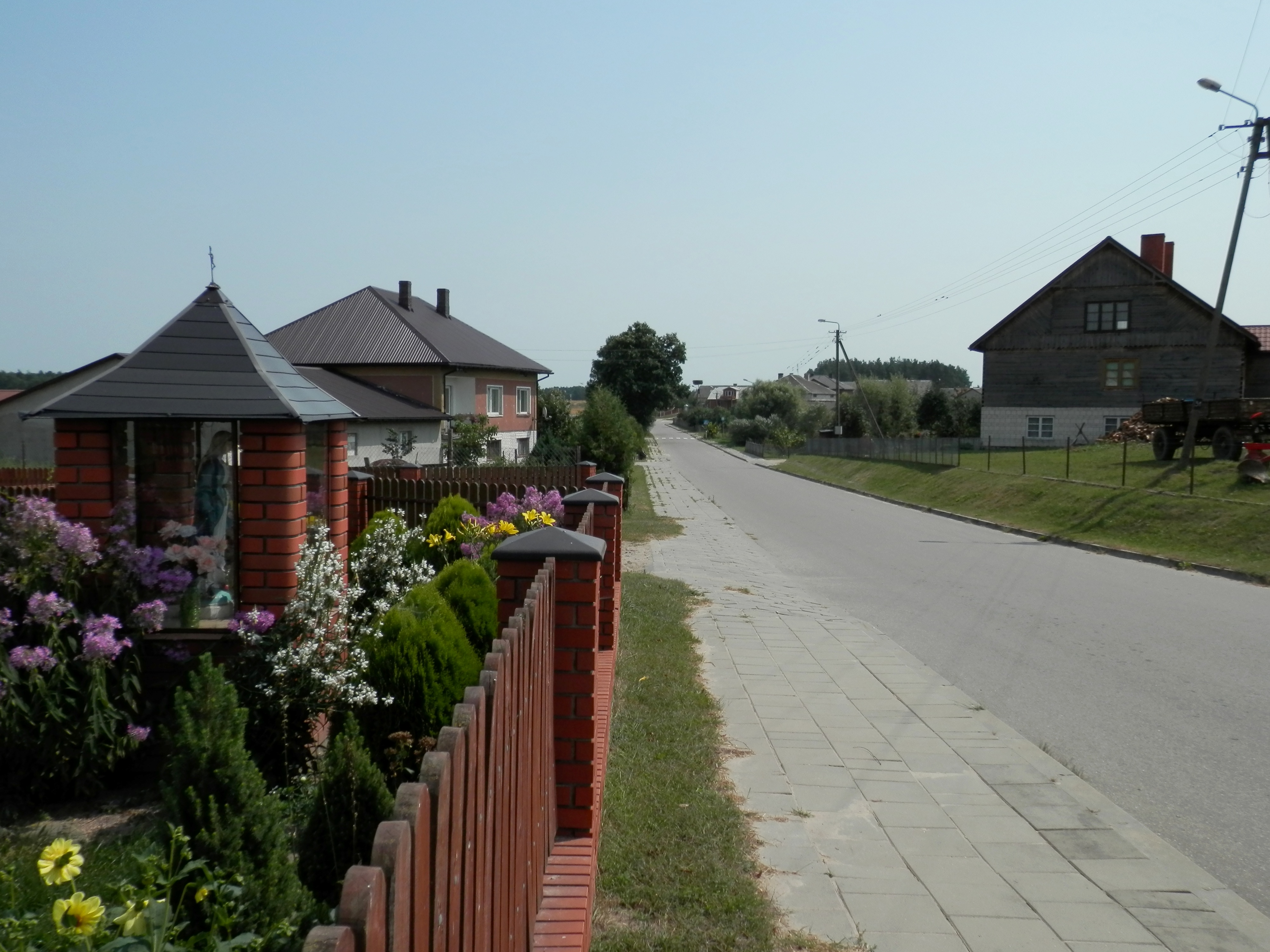

- Location within Poland
- Coordinates: 52°59′25″N 22°27′38″E
- Country: Poland
- Voivodeship: Podlaskie
- County: Wysokie Mazowieckie
- Gmina: Kulesze Kościelne
- Time zone: UTC+1 (CET)
  - Summer (DST): UTC+2 (CEST)
- Vehicle registration: BWM

Gołasze Mościckie [ɡɔˈwaʂɛ mɔɕˈt͡ɕit͡skʲɛ] is a village in the administrative district of Gmina Kulesze Kościelne, within Wysokie Mazowieckie County, Podlaskie Voivodeship, in north-eastern Poland.

== History ==
In 1827 Gołasze Mościckie had a population of 93.

During the German invasion of Poland at the start of World War II in 1939, the Germans carried out a massacre of a group of local Poles, whom they gunned down, whereas one farmer was burned alive (see Nazi crimes against the Polish nation).
