= Perki-Franki =

- Village
- Location within Poland
- Coordinates: 52°58′12″N 22°44′02″E
- Country: Poland
- Voivodeship: Podlaskie
- County: Wysokie Mazowieckie
- Gmina: Sokoły

Perki-Franki [ˈpɛrki ˈfraŋki] is a village in the administrative district of Gmina Sokoły, within Wysokie Mazowieckie County, Podlaskie Voivodeship, in north-eastern Poland.
