= Stare Truskolasy =

- Village
- Location within Poland
- Coordinates: 53°02′21″N 22°41′15″E
- Country: Poland
- Voivodeship: Podlaskie
- County: Wysokie Mazowieckie
- Gmina: Sokoły

Stare Truskolasy [ˈstarɛ truskɔˈlasɨ] is a village in the administrative district of Gmina Sokoły, within Wysokie Mazowieckie County, Podlaskie Voivodeship, in north-eastern Poland.
