= Gmina Kulesze Kościelne =

Gmina Kulesze Kościelne Kulesze Kościelne Commune
- Gmina
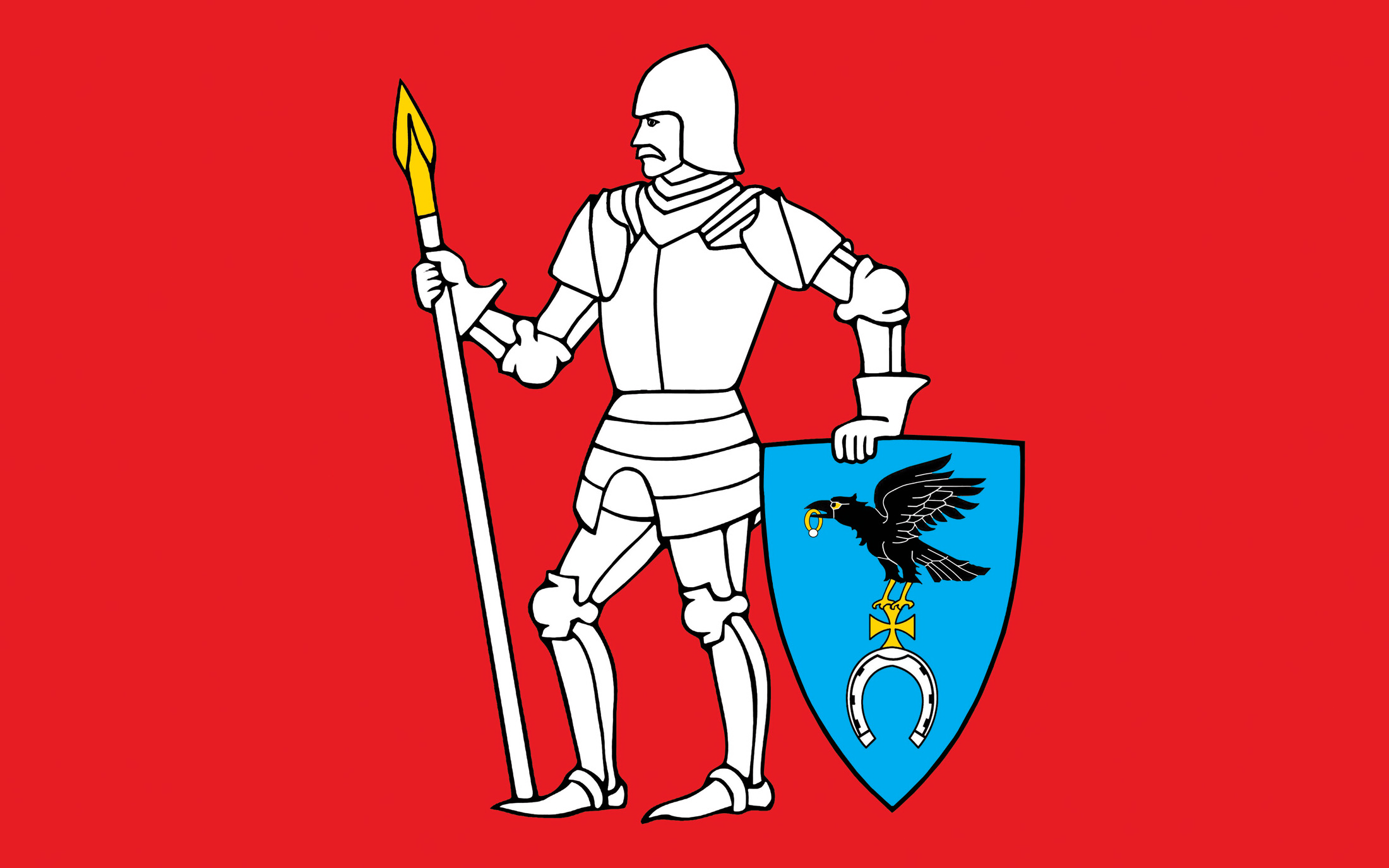
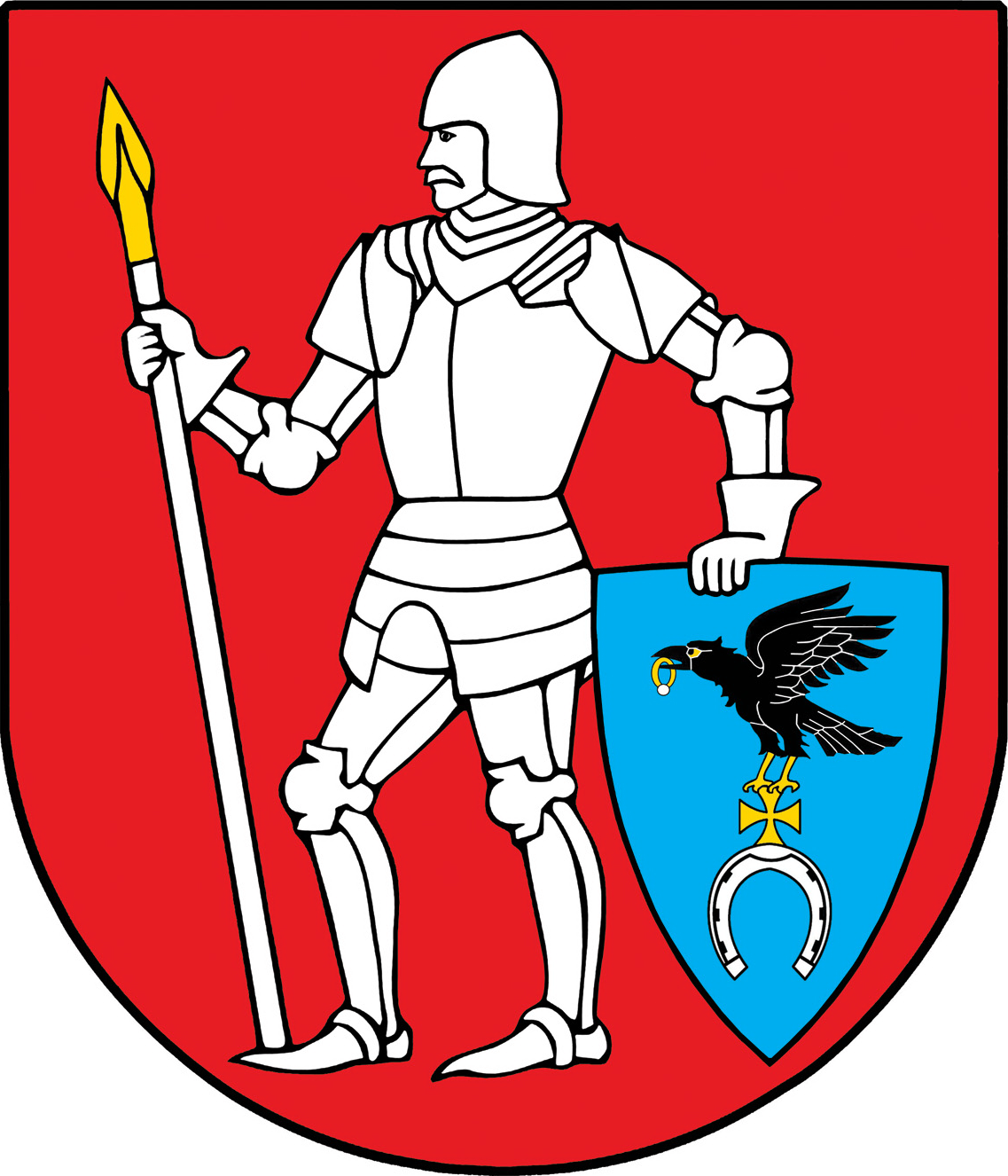
- Flag Coat of arms
- Interactive map of Gmina Kulesze Kościelne
- Coordinates (Kulesze Kościelne): 53°2′N 22°30′E
- Country: Poland
- Voivodeship: Podlaskie
- County: Wysokie Mazowieckie
- Seat: Kulesze Kościelne

Area
  - Total: 115.45 km^{2} (44.58 sq mi)

Population (2013)
  - Total: 3,219
  - Density: 27.88/km^{2} (72.21/sq mi)
- Website: http://www.kuleszek.pl/

Gmina Kulesze Kościelne is a rural gmina (administrative district) in Wysokie Mazowieckie County, Podlaskie Voivodeship, in north-eastern Poland. Its seat is the village of Kulesze Kościelne, which lies approximately 13 kilometres (8 mi) north of Wysokie Mazowieckie and 46 km (29 mi) west of the regional capital Białystok.

The gmina covers an area of 115.45 square kilometres (44.6 sq mi), and as of 2006 its total population is 3,361 (3,219 in 2013).

== Villages ==
Gmina Kulesze Kościelne contains the villages and settlements of Chojane-Bąki, Chojane-Gorczany, Chojane-Pawłowięta, Chojane-Piecki, Chojane-Sierocięta, Chojane-Stankowięta, Czarnowo-Biki, Faszcze, Gołasze Mościckie, Gołasze-Dąb, Grodzkie Szczepanowięta, Kalinowo-Solki, Kulesze Kościelne, Kulesze Podlipne, Kulesze-Litewka, Kulesze-Podawce, Leśniewo-Niedźwiedź, Niziołki-Dobki, Nowe Grodzkie, Nowe Kalinowo, Nowe Wiechy, Nowe Wykno, Stara Litwa, Stare Grodzkie, Stare Kalinowo, Stare Niziołki, Stare Wykno, Stypułki-Giemzino, Tybory Uszyńskie, Wnory-Pażochy, Wnory-Wiechy and Wnory-Wypychy.

== Neighbouring gminas ==
Gmina Kulesze Kościelne is bordered by the gminas of Kobylin-Borzymy, Kołaki Kościelne, Rutki, Sokoły and Wysokie Mazowieckie.
