= Kulesze-Podawce =

- Village
- Location within Poland
- Coordinates: 53°00′25″N 22°31′49″E
- Country: Poland
- Voivodeship: Podlaskie
- County: Wysokie Mazowieckie
- Gmina: Kulesze Kościelne
- Population (2021): 52

Kulesze-Podawce [kuˈlɛʂɛ pɔˈdaft͡sɛ] is a village in the administrative district of Gmina Kulesze Kościelne, within Wysokie Mazowieckie County, Podlaskie Voivodeship, in north-eastern Poland. As of 2021, it was home to 52 people.
