= Stara Litwa =

- Village
- Location within Poland
- Coordinates: 53°2′5″N 22°31′25″E
- Country: Poland
- Voivodeship: Podlaskie
- County: Wysokie Mazowieckie
- Gmina: Kulesze Kościelne

Stara Litwa [ˈstara ˈlitfa] (literal translation: Old Lithuania) is a village in the administrative district of Gmina Kulesze Kościelne, within Wysokie Mazowieckie County, Podlaskie Voivodeship, in north-eastern Poland.
