= Nowe Racibory =

- Village
- Location within Poland
- Coordinates: 52°55′55″N 22°42′22″E
- Country: Poland
- Voivodeship: Podlaskie
- County: Wysokie Mazowieckie
- Gmina: Sokoły

Nowe Racibory [ˈnɔvɛ rat͡ɕiˈbɔrɨ] is a village in the administrative district of Gmina Sokoły, within Wysokie Mazowieckie County, Podlaskie Voivodeship, in north-eastern Poland.
