= Jabłonowo-Wypychy =

Village in Gmina Sokoły, Poland

- Village
- Location within Poland
- Coordinates: 53°01′50″N 22°44′45″E
- Country: Poland
- Voivodeship: Podlaskie
- County: Wysokie Mazowieckie
- Gmina: Sokoły

Jabłonowo-Wypychy [jabwɔˈnɔvɔ vɨˈpɨxɨ] is a village in the administrative district of Gmina Sokoły, within Wysokie Mazowieckie County, Podlaskie Voivodeship, in north-eastern Poland.
