= Perki-Bujenki =

- Village
- Location within Poland
- Coordinates: 52°58′39″N 22°43′15″E
- Country: Poland
- Voivodeship: Podlaskie
- County: Wysokie Mazowieckie
- Gmina: Sokoły

Perki-Bujenki [ˈpɛrki buˈjɛŋki] is a village in the administrative district of Gmina Sokoły, within Wysokie Mazowieckie County, Podlaskie Voivodeship, in north-eastern Poland.
