= Czarnowo-Biki =

Village in Podlaskie Voivodeship, northeastern Poland

- Village
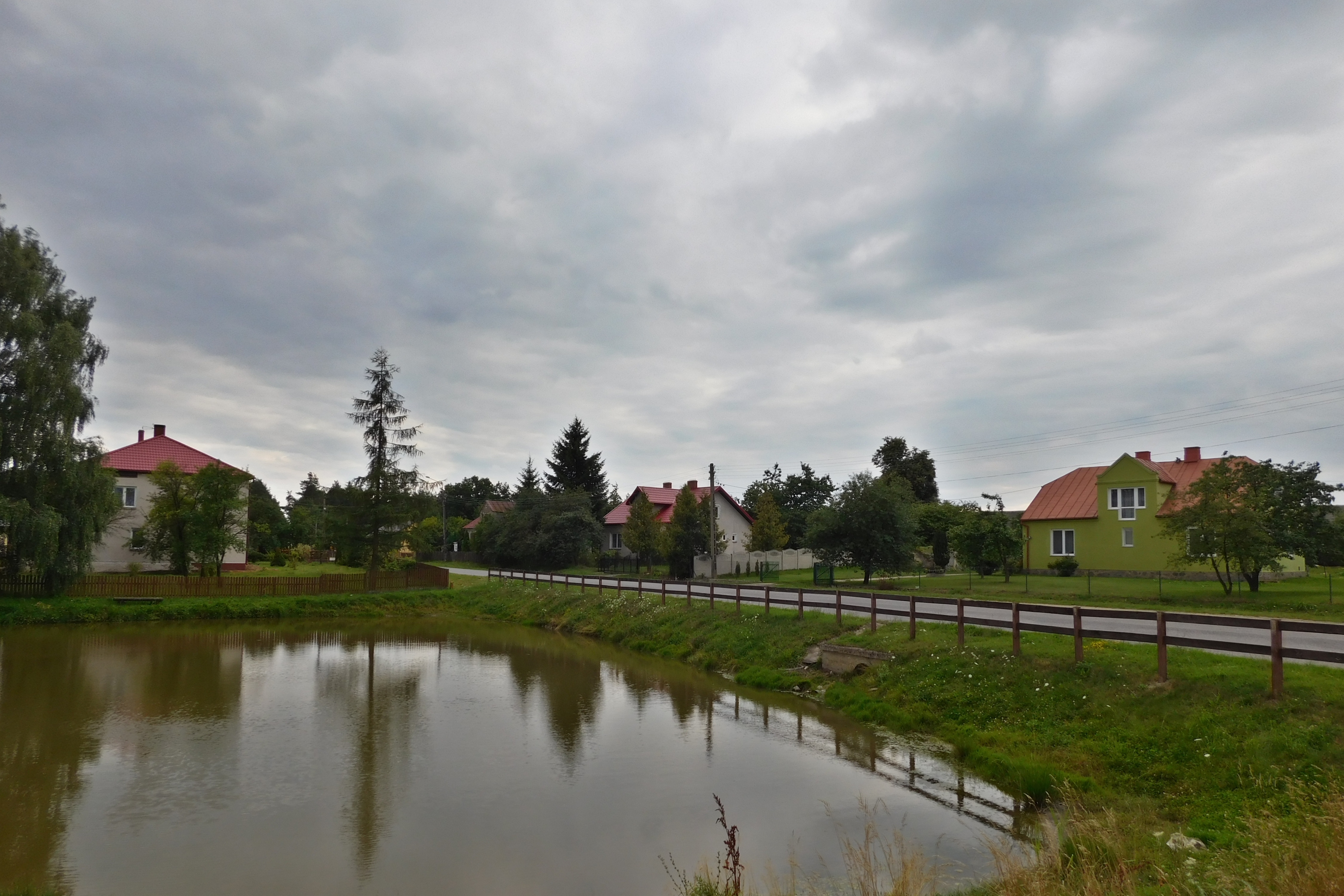
- View from a pond in Czarnowo-Biki

- Location within Poland
- Coordinates: 53°01′43″N 22°27′20″E
- Country: Poland
- Voivodeship: Podlaskie
- County: Wysokie Mazowieckie
- Gmina: Kulesze Kościelne
- Time zone: UTC+1 (CET)
  - Summer (DST): UTC+2 (CEST)

Czarnowo-Biki [t͡ʂarˈnɔvɔ ˈbiki] is a village in the administrative district of Gmina Kulesze Kościelne, within Wysokie Mazowieckie County, Podlaskie Voivodeship, in north-eastern Poland.

== History ==
Three Polish citizens were murdered by Nazi Germany in the village during World War II.
