= Roszki-Leśne =

- Village
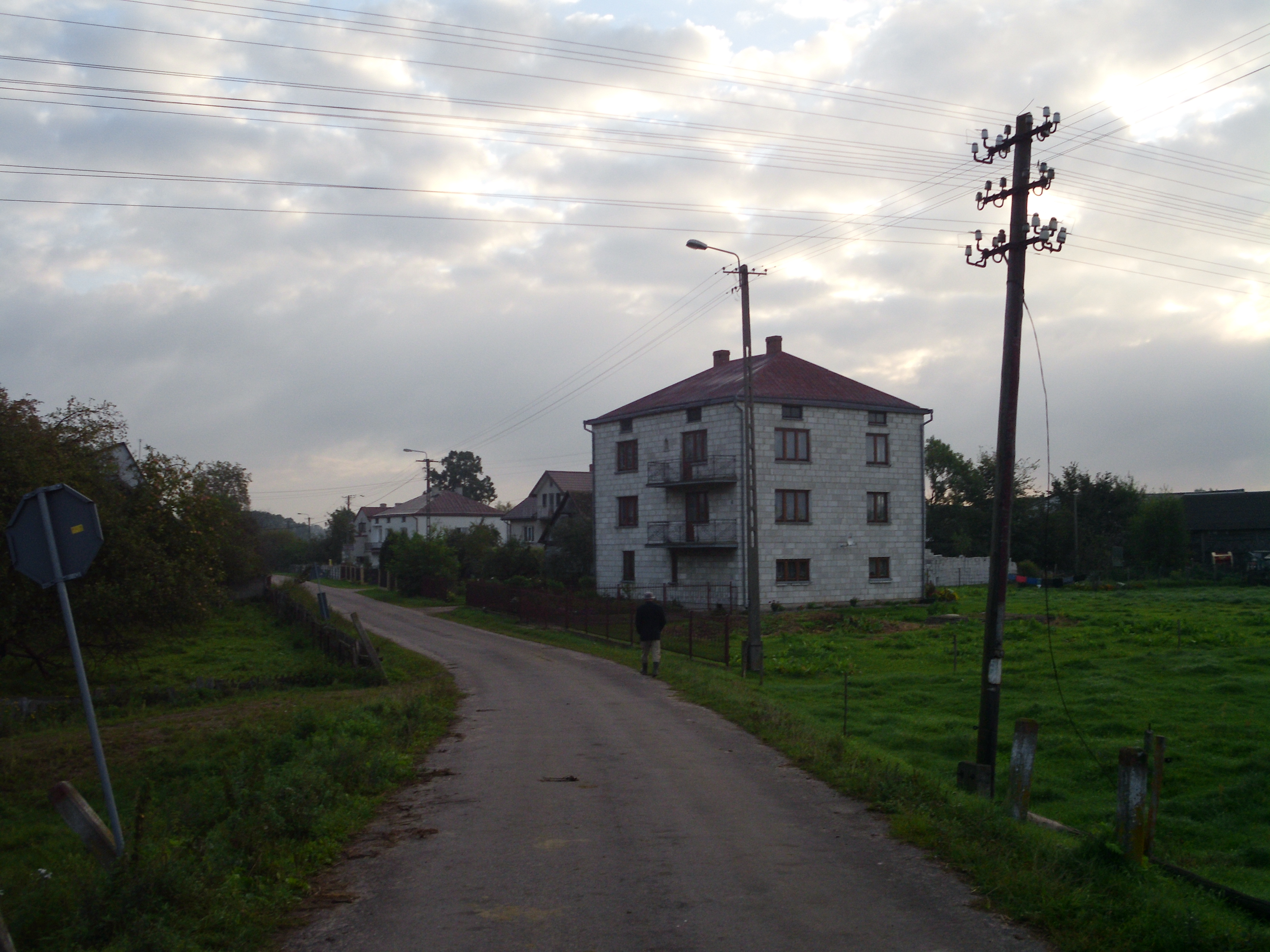

- Location within Poland
- Coordinates: 52°59′50″N 22°45′31″E
- Country: Poland
- Voivodeship: Podlaskie
- County: Wysokie Mazowieckie
- Gmina: Sokoły

Roszki-Leśne [ˈrɔʂki ˈlɛɕnɛ] is a village in the administrative district of Gmina Sokoły, within Wysokie Mazowieckie County, Podlaskie Voivodeship, in north-eastern Poland.

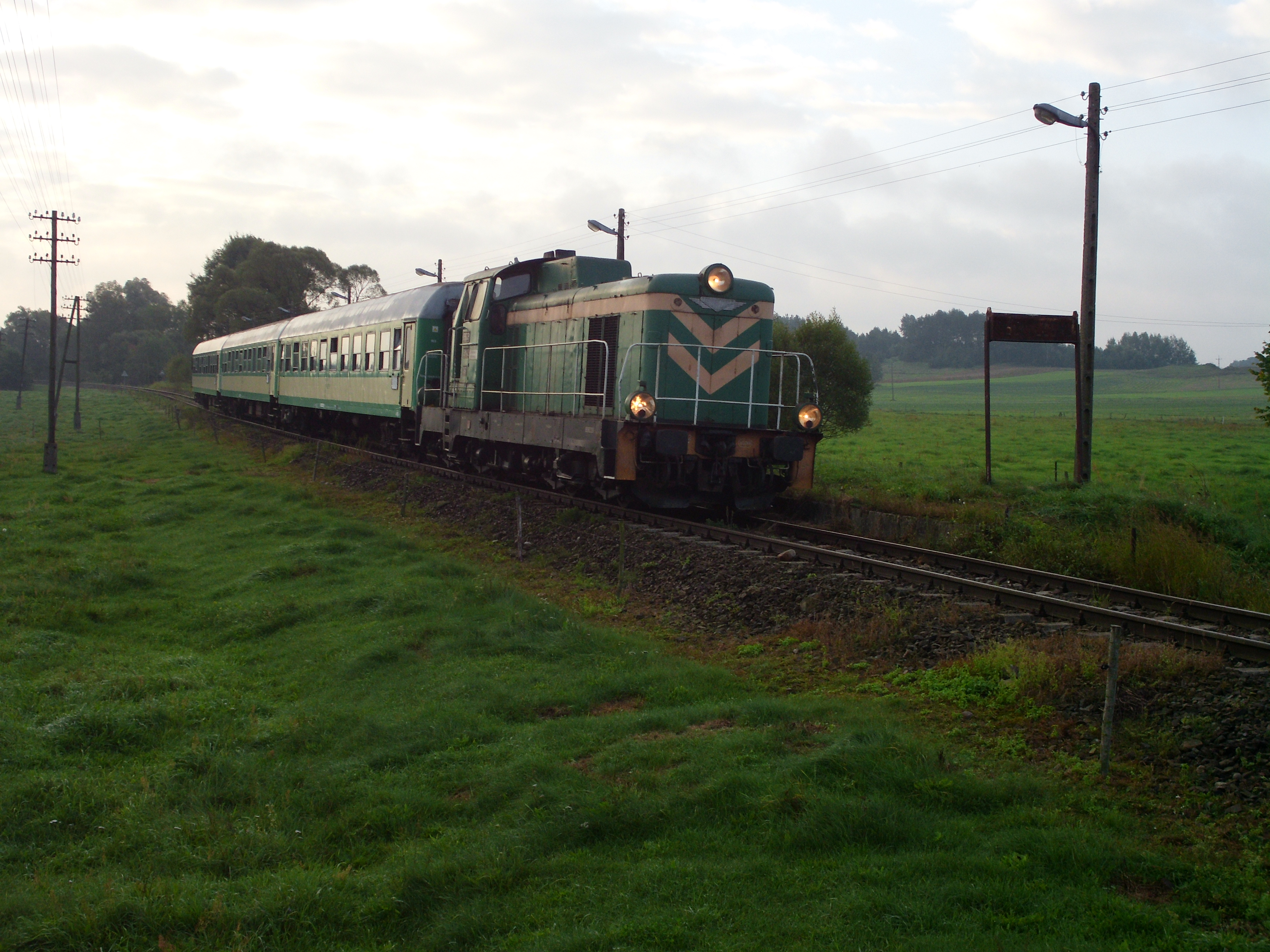
Tourist train at a disused train stop (2012)
