= Wnory-Pażochy =

- Village
- Location within Poland
- Coordinates: 53°00′47″N 22°35′38″E
- Country: Poland
- Voivodeship: Podlaskie
- County: Wysokie Mazowieckie
- Gmina: Kulesze Kościelne

Population
  - Total: 120
- Postal code: 18-208
- Vehicle registration: BWM

Wnory-Pażochy [ˈvnɔrɨ paˈʐɔxɨ] is a village in the administrative district of Gmina Kulesze Kościelne, within Wysokie Mazowieckie County, Podlaskie Voivodeship, in north-eastern Poland.
