= Jamiołki-Świetliki =

- Village
- Location within Poland
- Coordinates: 53°0′N 22°38′E
- Country: Poland
- Voivodeship: Podlaskie
- County: Wysokie Mazowieckie
- Gmina: Sokoły
- Elevation: 142 m (466 ft)
- Population: 25

Jamiołki-Świetliki (Polish pronunciation: [jaˈmjɔwkʲi ɕfjɛˈtlikʲi]) is a village in the administrative district of Gmina Sokoły, within Wysokie Mazowieckie County, Podlaskie Voivodeship, in north-eastern Poland.
