= Dworaki-Staśki =

- Village
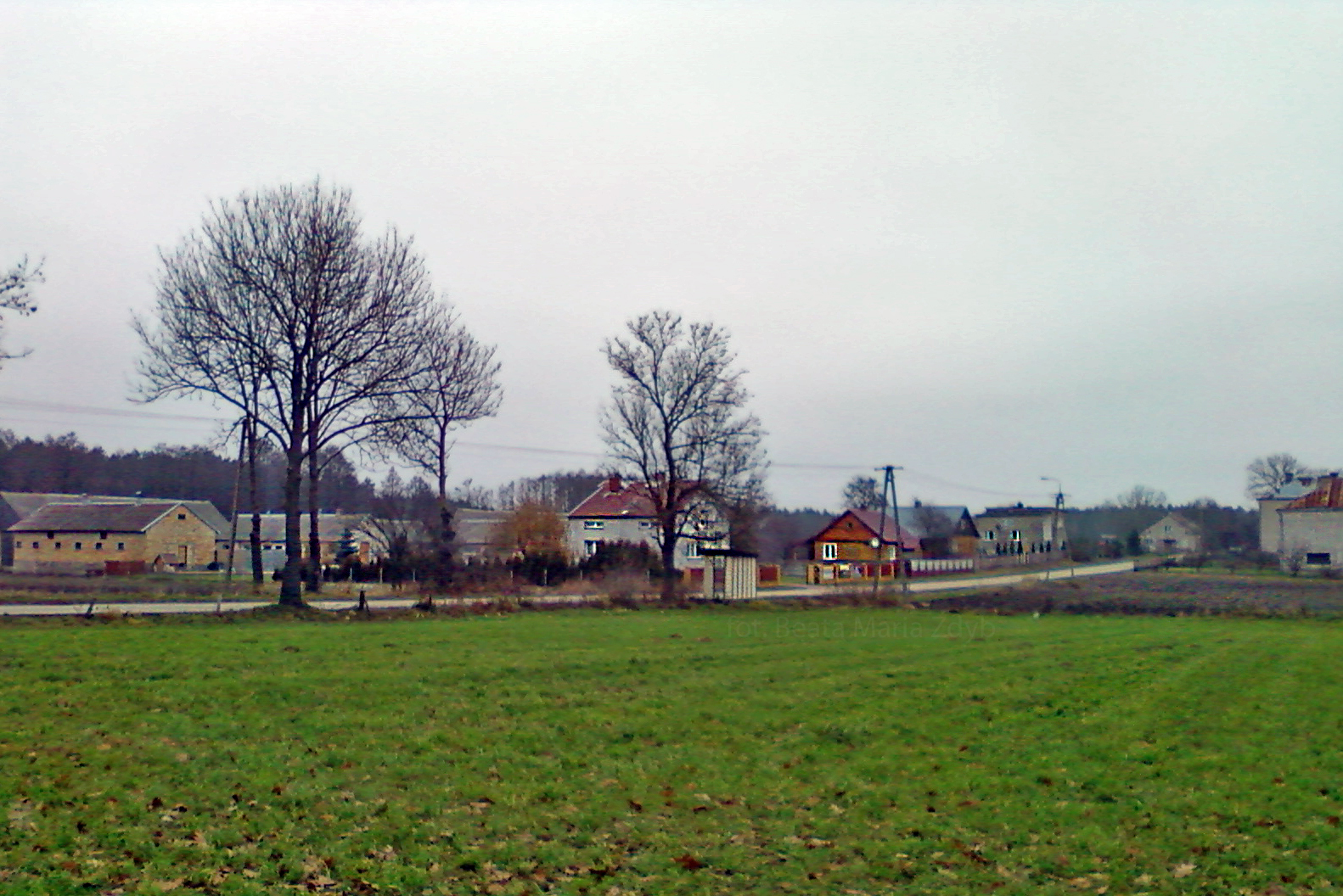
- View of Dworaki-Staśki

- Location within Poland
- Coordinates: 52°57′14″N 22°45′18″E
- Country: Poland
- Voivodeship: Podlaskie
- County: Wysokie Mazowieckie
- Gmina: Sokoły

Dworaki-Staśki [dvɔˈraki ˈstaɕki] is a village in the administrative district of Gmina Sokoły, within Wysokie Mazowieckie County, Podlaskie Voivodeship, in north-eastern Poland.
