= Stare Grodzkie =

- Village
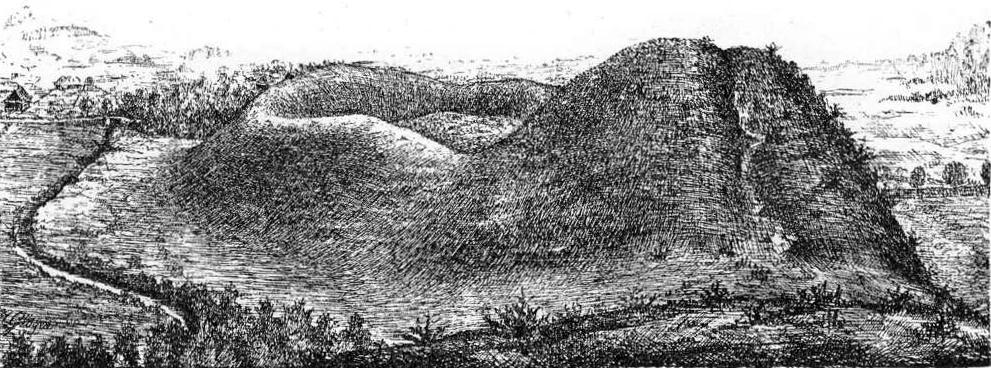
- Illustration for Stare Grodzkie

- Location within Poland
- Coordinates: 53°02′44″N 22°33′08″E
- Country: Poland
- Voivodeship: Podlaskie
- County: Wysokie Mazowieckie
- Gmina: Kulesze Kościelne

Stare Grodzkie [ˈstarɛ ˈɡrɔt͡skʲɛ] is a village in the administrative district of Gmina Kulesze Kościelne. It is within Wysokie Mazowieckie County, Podlaskie Voivodeship, in north-eastern Poland.
