= Nowe Wiechy =

- Settlement
- Location within Poland
- Coordinates: 53°00′59″N 22°33′59″E
- Country: Poland
- Voivodeship: Podlaskie
- County: Wysokie Mazowieckie
- Gmina: Kulesze Kościelne

Nowe Wiechy [ˈnɔvɛ ˈvjɛxɨ] is a settlement in the administrative district of Gmina Kulesze Kościelne, within Wysokie Mazowieckie County, Podlaskie Voivodeship, in north-eastern Poland.
