= Roszki-Chrzczony =

- Village
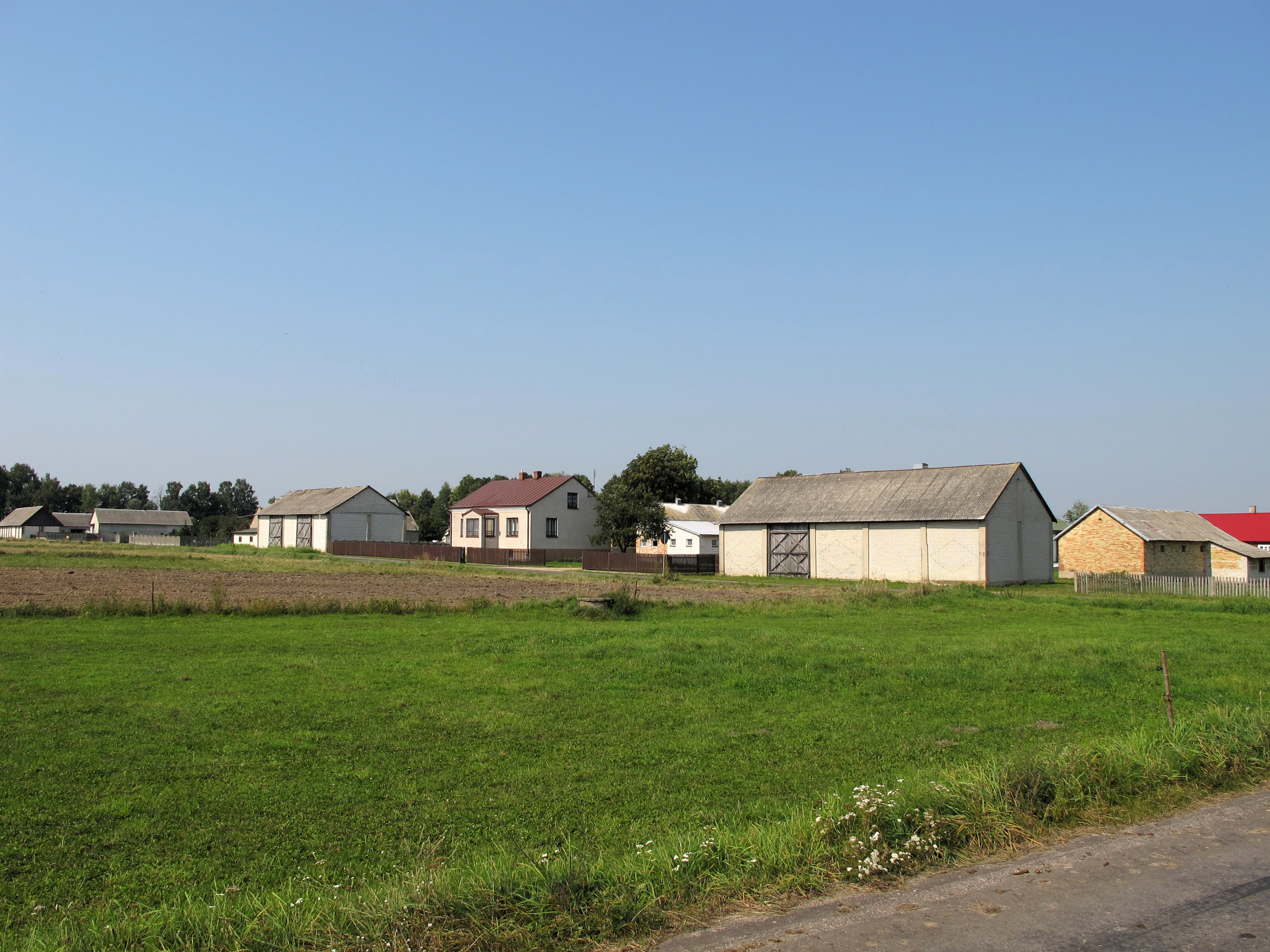
- View of Roszki-Chrzczony

- Location within Poland
- Coordinates: 53°00′08″N 22°45′15″E
- Country: Poland
- Voivodeship: Podlaskie
- County: Wysokie Mazowieckie
- Gmina: Sokoły

Roszki-Chrzczony [ˈrɔʂki ˈxʂt͡ʂɔnɨ] is a village in the administrative district of Gmina Sokoły, within Wysokie Mazowieckie County, Podlaskie Voivodeship, in north-eastern Poland.
