= Grodzkie Szczepanowięta =

- Village
- Location within Poland
- Coordinates: 53°3′N 22°33′E
- Country: Poland
- Voivodeship: Podlaskie
- County: Wysokie Mazowieckie
- Gmina: Kulesze Kościelne

Grodzkie Szczepanowięta [ˈɡrɔt͡skʲɛ ʂt͡ʂɛpanɔˈvjɛnta] is a village in the administrative district of Gmina Kulesze Kościelne, within Wysokie Mazowieckie County, Podlaskie Voivodeship, in north-eastern Poland.
