= Waniewo, Wysokie Mazowieckie County =

Waniewo
- Village
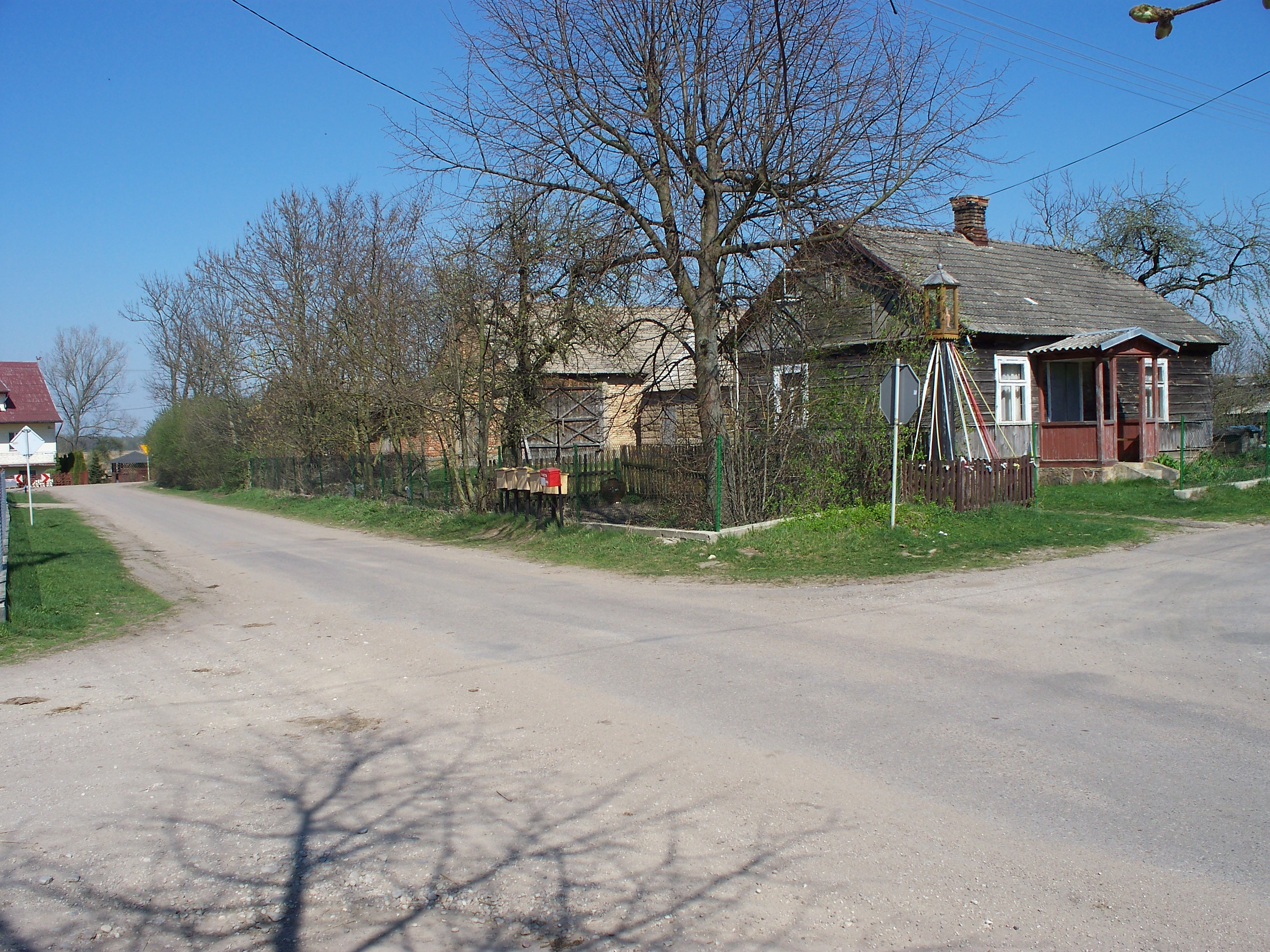

- Location within Poland
- Coordinates: 53°4′N 22°48′E
- Country: Poland
- Voivodeship: Podlaskie
- County: Wysokie Mazowieckie
- Gmina: Sokoły

Population
  - Total: 200
- Time zone: UTC+1 (CET)
  - Summer (DST): UTC+2 (CEST)

Waniewo [vaˈɲɛvɔ] is a village in the administrative district of Gmina Sokoły, within Wysokie Mazowieckie County, Podlaskie Voivodeship, in north-eastern Poland.

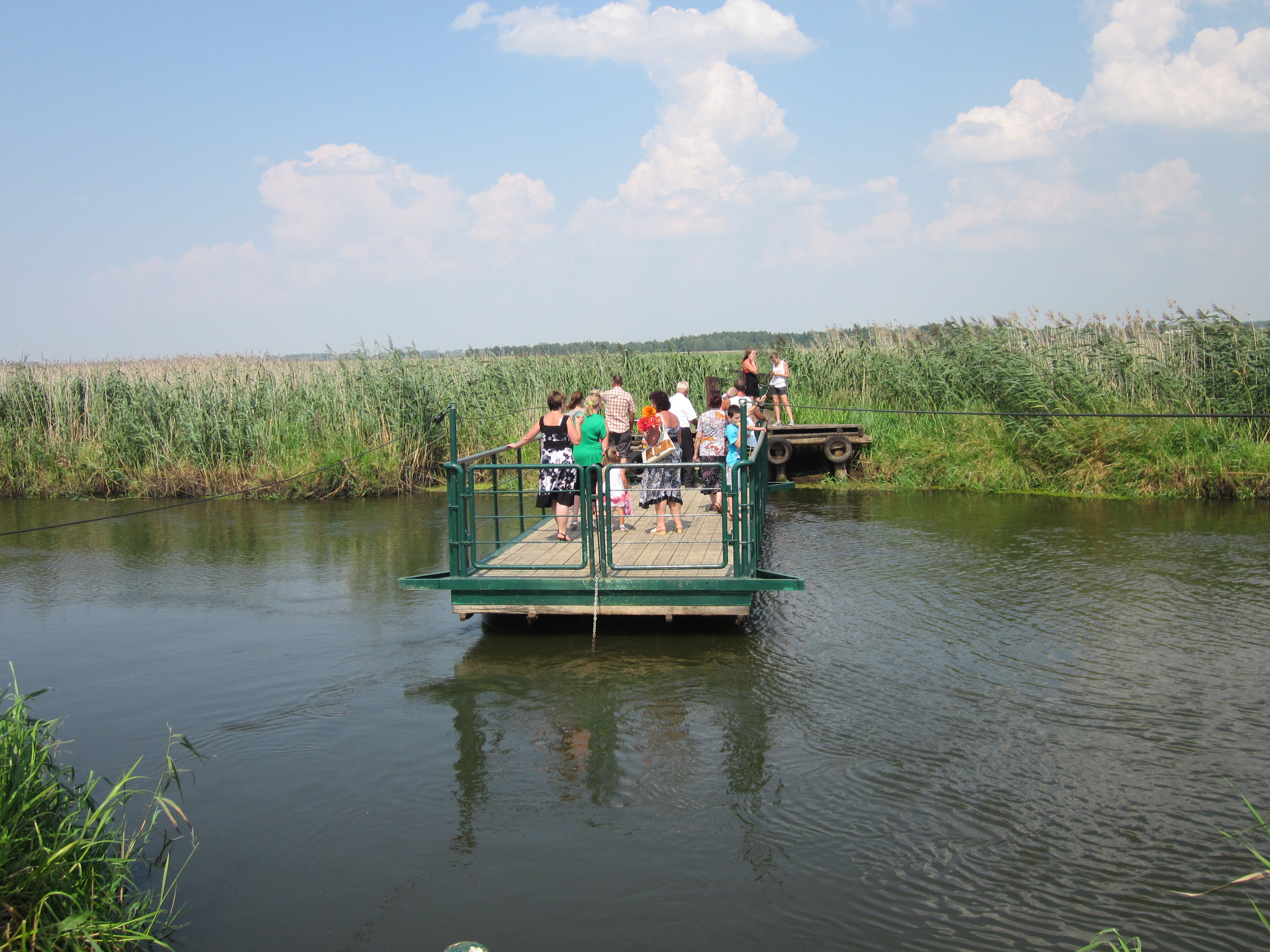
Waniewo - Narew

== History ==
It was a private town, administratively located in the Bielsk County in the Podlaskie Voivodeship in the Lesser Poland Province of the Kingdom of Poland.

Following the German-Soviet invasion of Poland, which started World War II in September 1939, the town was occupied by the Soviet Union until 1941, and then by Nazi Germany until 1944.
