= Truskolasy-Wola =

- Village
- Location within Poland
- Coordinates: 53°01′36″N 22°39′56″E
- Country: Poland
- Voivodeship: Podlaskie
- County: Wysokie Mazowieckie
- Gmina: Sokoły

Truskolasy-Wola [truskɔˈlasɨ ˈvɔla] is a village in the administrative district of Gmina Sokoły, within Wysokie Mazowieckie County, Podlaskie Voivodeship, in north-eastern Poland.
