= Stare Niziołki =

- Village
- Location within Poland
- Coordinates: 53°02′39″N 22°30′34″E
- Country: Poland
- Voivodeship: Podlaskie
- County: Wysokie Mazowieckie
- Gmina: Kulesze Kościelne

Stare Niziołki [ˈstarɛ niˈʑɔu̯ki] is a village in the administrative district of Gmina Kulesze Kościelne, within Wysokie Mazowieckie County, Podlaskie Voivodeship, in north-eastern Poland.
