= Wnory-Wypychy =

- Village
- Location within Poland
- Coordinates: 53°2′N 22°33′E
- Country: Poland
- Voivodeship: Podlaskie
- County: Wysokie Mazowieckie
- Gmina: Kulesze Kościelne

Population
  - Total: 150
- Postal code: 18-208
- Vehicle registration: BWM

Wnory-Wypychy [ˈvnɔrɨ vɨˈpɨxɨ] is a village in the administrative district of Gmina Kulesze Kościelne, within Wysokie Mazowieckie County, Podlaskie Voivodeship, in north-eastern Poland.
