= Stare Kalinowo =

- Village
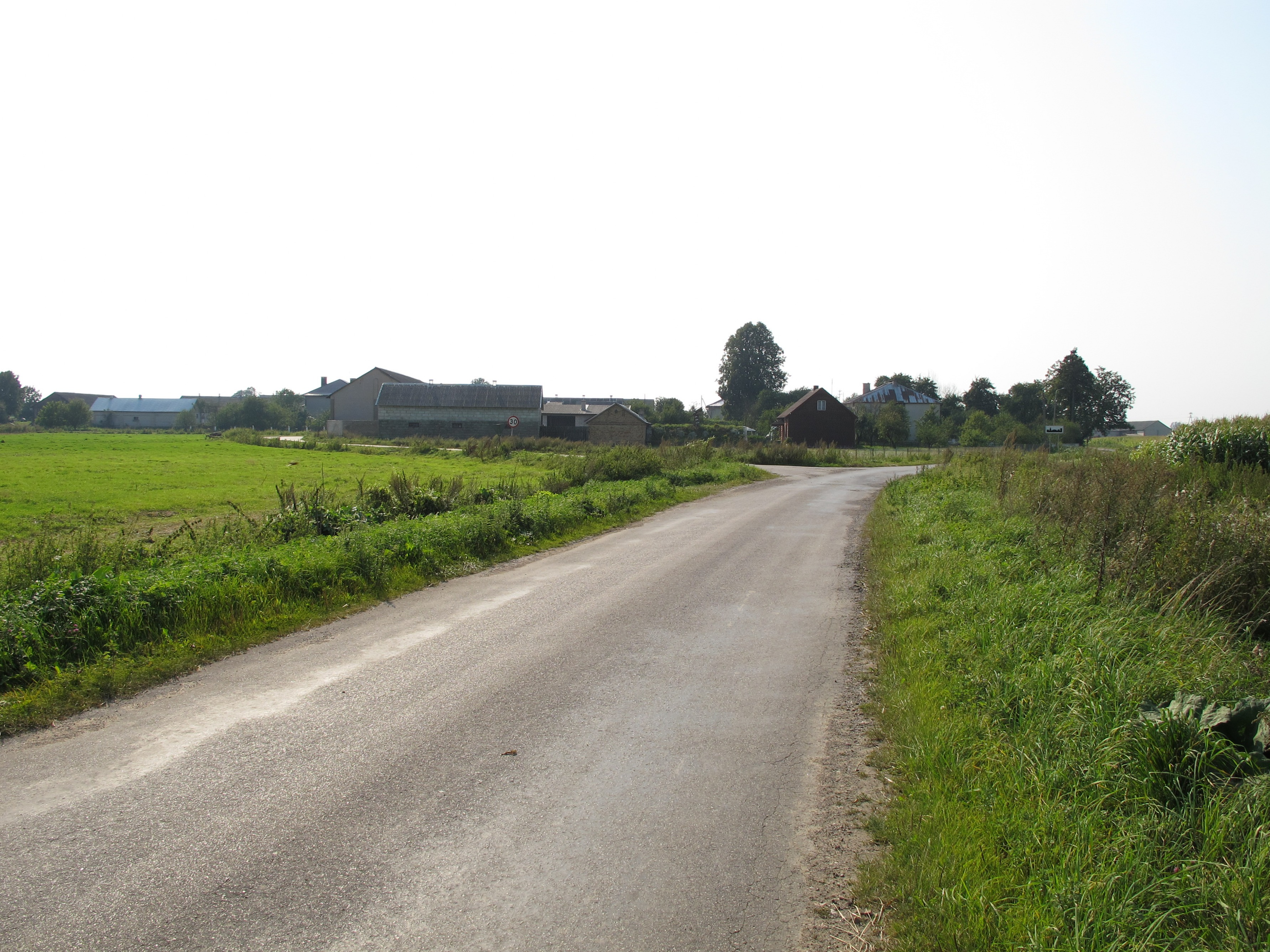
- Houses by the roadside of Stare Kalinowo

- Location within Poland
- Coordinates: 52°58′24″N 22°35′48″E
- Country: Poland
- Voivodeship: Podlaskie
- County: Wysokie Mazowieckie
- Gmina: Kulesze Kościelne

Stare Kalinowo [ˈstarɛ kaliˈnɔvɔ] is a village in the administrative district of Gmina Kulesze Kościelne, within Wysokie Mazowieckie County, Podlaskie Voivodeship, in north-eastern Poland.
