= Czajki, Podlaskie Voivodeship =

Czajki
- Village
- Location within Poland
- Coordinates: 53°4′N 22°42′E
- Country: Poland
- Voivodeship: Podlaskie
- County: Wysokie Mazowieckie
- Gmina: Sokoły
- Postal code: 18-218
- Vehicle registration: BWM

Czajki [ˈt͡ʂai̯ki] is a village in the administrative district of Gmina Sokoły, within Wysokie Mazowieckie County, Podlaskie Voivodeship, in north-eastern Poland.

Five Polish citizens were murdered by Nazi Germany in the village during World War II.
