= Leśniewo-Niedźwiedź =

Village in Gmina Kulesze Kościelne, Poland

- Village
- Location within Poland
- Coordinates: 53°01′27″N 22°38′09″E
- Country: Poland
- Voivodeship: Podlaskie
- County: Wysokie Mazowieckie
- Gmina: Kulesze Kościelne

Leśniewo-Niedźwiedź [lɛɕˈɲɛvɔ ˈɲɛd͡ʑvjɛt͡ɕ] is a village in the administrative district of Gmina Kulesze Kościelne, within Wysokie Mazowieckie County, Podlaskie Voivodeship, in north-eastern Poland.
