= Kruszewo-Brodowo =

- Village
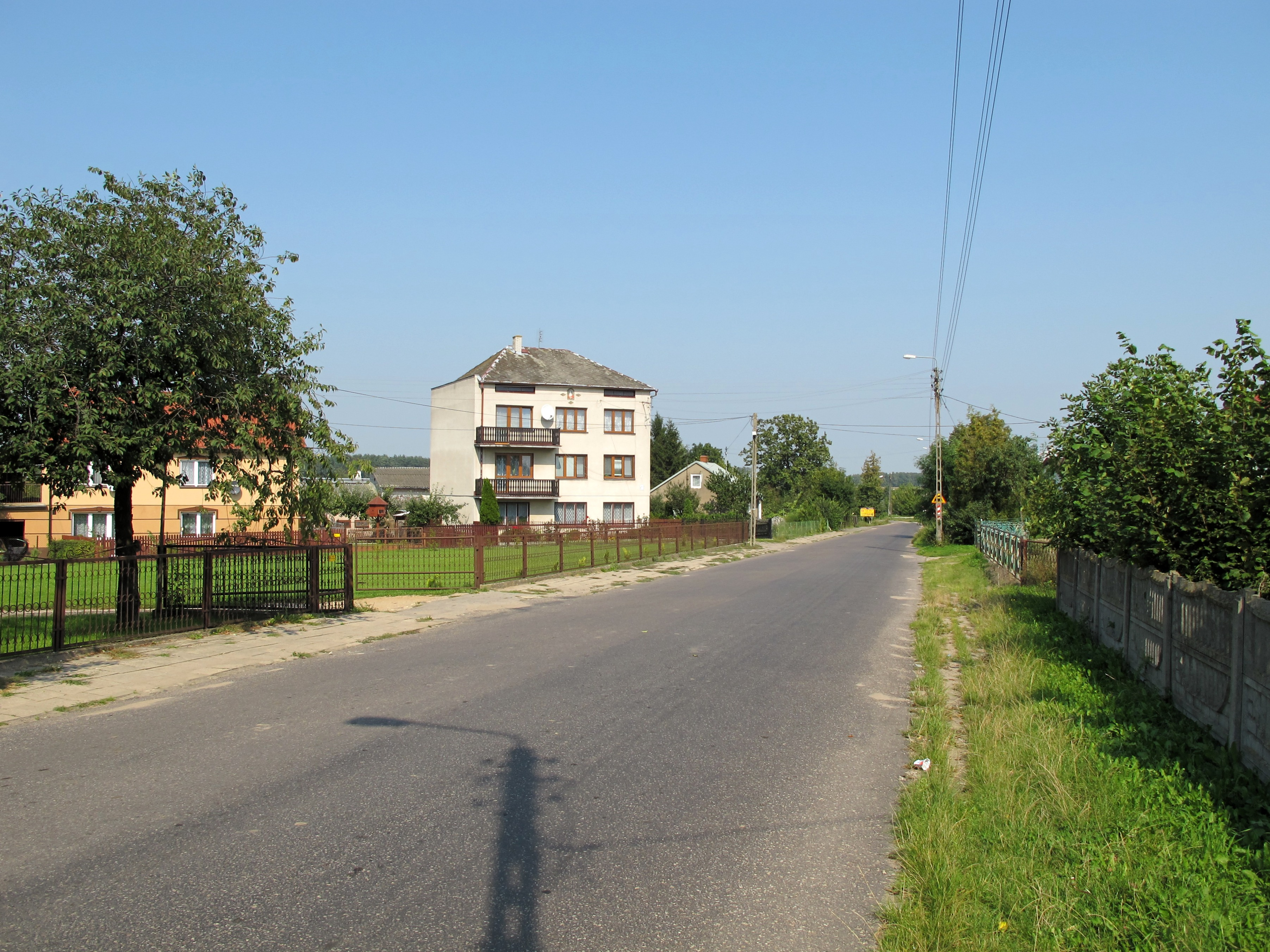
- Houses by the roadside of Kruszewo-Brodowo

- Location within Poland
- Coordinates: 52°59′57″N 22°43′08″E
- Country: Poland
- Voivodeship: Podlaskie
- County: Wysokie Mazowieckie
- Gmina: Sokoły

Kruszewo-Brodowo [kruˈʂɛvɔ brɔˈdɔvɔ] is a village in the administrative district of Gmina Sokoły, within Wysokie Mazowieckie County, Podlaskie Voivodeship, in north-eastern Poland.
