= Jamiołki-Godzieby =

- Village
- Location within Poland
- Coordinates: 53°1′N 22°39′E
- Country: Poland
- Voivodeship: Podlaskie
- County: Wysokie Mazowieckie
- Gmina: Sokoły
- Elevation: 142 m (466 ft)
- Population: 50

Jamiołki-Godzieby (Polish pronunciation: [jaˈmjɔwkʲi ɡɔˈd͡ʑɛbɨ]) is a village in the administrative district of Gmina Sokoły, within Wysokie Mazowieckie County, Podlaskie Voivodeship, in north-eastern Poland.
