= Dworaki-Pikaty =

- Village
- Location within Poland
- Coordinates: 52°57′01″N 22°44′48″E
- Country: Poland
- Voivodeship: Podlaskie
- County: Wysokie Mazowieckie
- Gmina: Sokoły

Dworaki-Pikaty [dvɔˈraki piˈkatɨ] is a village in the administrative district of Gmina Sokoły, within Wysokie Mazowieckie County, Podlaskie Voivodeship, in north-eastern Poland.
