= Roszki-Sączki =

Village in Gmina Sokoły, Poland

- Village
- Location within Poland
- Coordinates: 52°59′12″N 22°45′53″E
- Country: Poland
- Voivodeship: Podlaskie
- County: Wysokie Mazowieckie
- Gmina: Sokoły

Roszki-Sączki [ˈrɔʂki ˈsɔnt͡ʂki] is a village in the administrative district of Gmina Sokoły, within Wysokie Mazowieckie County, Podlaskie Voivodeship, in north-eastern Poland.
