= Truskolasy-Lachy =

- Village
- Location within Poland
- Coordinates: 53°01′56″N 22°42′00″E
- Country: Poland
- Voivodeship: Podlaskie
- County: Wysokie Mazowieckie
- Gmina: Sokoły
- Time zone: UTC+1 (CET)
  - Summer (DST): UTC+2 (CEST)
- Vehicle registration: BWM

Truskolasy-Lachy ([truskɔˈlasɨ ˈlaxɨ]) is a village in the administrative district of Gmina Sokoły, within Wysokie Mazowieckie County, Podlaskie Voivodeship, in north-eastern Poland.

== History ==
In 1827 Truskolasy-Lachy had a population of 87.

During the joint German-Soviet invasion of Poland at the start of World War II, in September 1939, the village was pacified by the German Army, with four local Poles murdered, including two women (see Nazi crimes against the Polish nation).
