= Porośl-Kije =

- Village
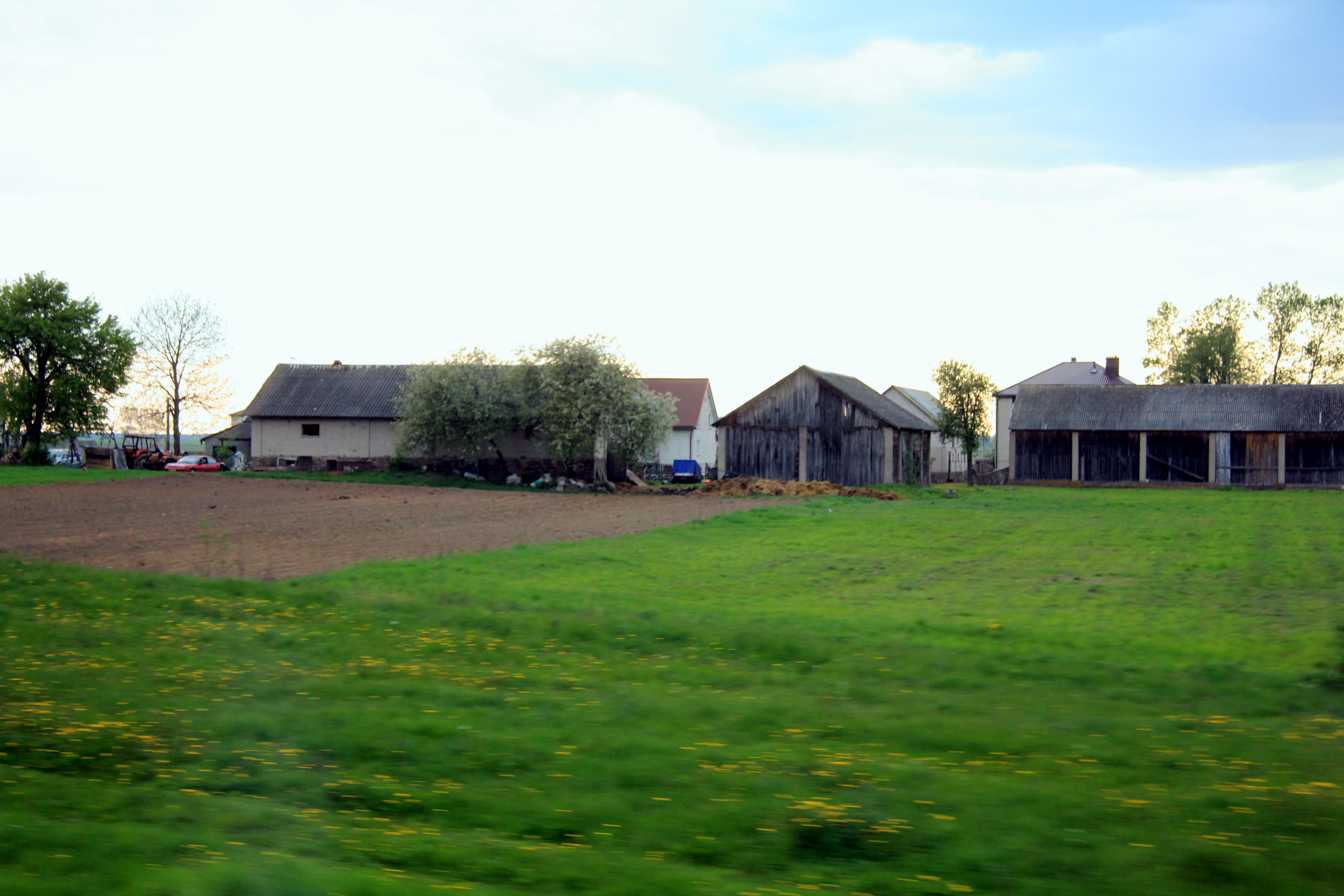

- Location within Poland
- Coordinates: 52°56′11″N 22°43′32″E
- Country: Poland
- Voivodeship: Podlaskie
- County: Wysokie Mazowieckie
- Gmina: Sokoły

Porośl-Kije [ˈpɔrɔɕl ˈkijɛ] is a village in the administrative district of Gmina Sokoły, within Wysokie Mazowieckie County, Podlaskie Voivodeship, in north-eastern Poland.
