= Roszki-Ziemaki =

- Village
- Location within Poland
- Coordinates: 53°01′21″N 22°46′08″E
- Country: Poland
- Voivodeship: Podlaskie
- County: Wysokie Mazowieckie
- Gmina: Sokoły

Roszki-Ziemaki [ˈrɔʂki ʑɛˈmaki] is a village in the administrative district of Gmina Sokoły, within Wysokie Mazowieckie County, Podlaskie Voivodeship, in north-eastern Poland.
