= Gmina Sokoły =

Gmina Sokoły Sokoły Commune
- Gmina
- Flag Coat of arms
- Interactive map of Gmina Sokoły
- Coordinates (Sokoły): 52°59′34″N 22°42′2″E
- Country: Poland
- Voivodeship: Podlaskie
- County: Wysokie Mazowieckie
- Seat: Sokoły

Area
  - Total: 155.57 km^{2} (60.07 sq mi)

Population (2013)
  - Total: 5,843
  - Density: 37.56/km^{2} (97.28/sq mi)
- Website: http://sokoly.podlaskie.pl

Gmina Sokoły is a rural gmina (administrative district) in Wysokie Mazowieckie County, Podlaskie Voivodeship, in north-eastern Poland. Its seat is the village of Sokoły, which lies approximately 15 kilometres (9 mi) north-east of Wysokie Mazowieckie and 35 km (22 mi) south-west of the regional capital Białystok.

The gmina covers an area of 155.57 square kilometres (60.1 sq mi), and as of 2006 its total population is 5,952 (5,843 in 2013).

== Villages ==
Gmina Sokoły contains the villages and settlements of:

- Bruszewo
- Bruszewo-Borkowizna
- Bujny
- Chomice
- Czajki
- Drągi
- Dworaki-Pikaty
- Dworaki-Staśki
- Idźki Młynowskie
- Idźki Średnie
- Idźki-Wykno
- Jabłonowo-Kąty
- Jabłonowo-Wypychy
- Jamiołki-Godzieby
- Jamiołki-Kowale
- Jamiołki-Piotrowięta
- Jamiołki-Świetliki
- Jeńki
- Kowalewszczyzna
- Kowalewszczyzna-Folwark
- Kruszewo-Brodowo
- Kruszewo-Głąby
- Kruszewo-Wypychy
- Krzyżewo
- Mojsiki
- Noski Śnietne
- Nowe Racibory
- Perki-Bujenki
- Perki-Franki
- Perki-Karpie
- Perki-Lachy
- Perki-Mazowsze
- Perki-Wypychy
- Pęzy
- Porośl-Kije
- Roszki-Chrzczony
- Roszki-Leśne
- Roszki-Sączki
- Roszki-Ziemaki
- Rzące
- Sokoły
- Stare Racibory
- Stare Truskolasy
- Truskolasy-Lachy
- Truskolasy-Niwisko
- Truskolasy-Olszyna
- Truskolasy-Wola
- Waniewo

== Neighbouring gminas ==
Gmina Sokoły is bordered by the gminas of Choroszcz, Kobylin-Borzymy, Kulesze Kościelne, Łapy, Nowe Piekuty, Poświętne and Wysokie Mazowieckie.
