= Nowe Grodzkie =

- Village
- Location within Poland
- Coordinates: 53°02′01″N 22°32′07″E
- Country: Poland
- Voivodeship: Podlaskie
- County: Wysokie Mazowieckie
- Gmina: Kulesze Kościelne
- Website: http://www.nowegrodzkie.xt.pl/

Nowe Grodzkie [ˈnɔvɛ ˈɡrɔt͡skʲɛ] is a village in the administrative district of Gmina Kulesze Kościelne, within Wysokie Mazowieckie County, Podlaskie Voivodeship, in north-eastern Poland.
