= Bujny, Podlaskie Voivodeship =

Bujny
- Village
- Location within Poland
- Coordinates: 52°57′N 22°40′E
- Country: Poland
- Voivodeship: Podlaskie
- County: Wysokie Mazowieckie
- Gmina: Sokoły
- Population: 80

Bujny (Polish pronunciation: [ˈbujnɨ]) is a village in the administrative district of Gmina Sokoły, within Wysokie Mazowieckie County, Podlaskie Voivodeship, in north-eastern Poland.
