= Chojane-Sierocięta =

- Village
- Location within Poland
- Coordinates: 52°58′N 22°31′E
- Country: Poland
- Voivodeship: Podlaskie
- County: Wysokie Mazowieckie
- Gmina: Kulesze Kościelne
- Population: 130

Chojane-Sierocięta [xɔˈjanɛ ɕɛrɔˈt͡ɕɛnta] is a village in the administrative district of Gmina Kulesze Kościelne, within Wysokie Mazowieckie County, Podlaskie Voivodeship, in north-eastern Poland.
