= Chojane-Gorczany =

- Village
- Location within Poland
- Coordinates: 52°59′N 22°32′E
- Country: Poland
- Voivodeship: Podlaskie
- County: Wysokie Mazowieckie
- Gmina: Kulesze Kościelne
- Population: 70

Chojane-Gorczany [xɔˈjanɛ ɡɔrˈt͡ʂanɨ] is a village in the administrative district of Gmina Kulesze Kościelne, within Wysokie Mazowieckie County, Podlaskie Voivodeship, in north-eastern Poland.
