= Bruszewo =

- Village
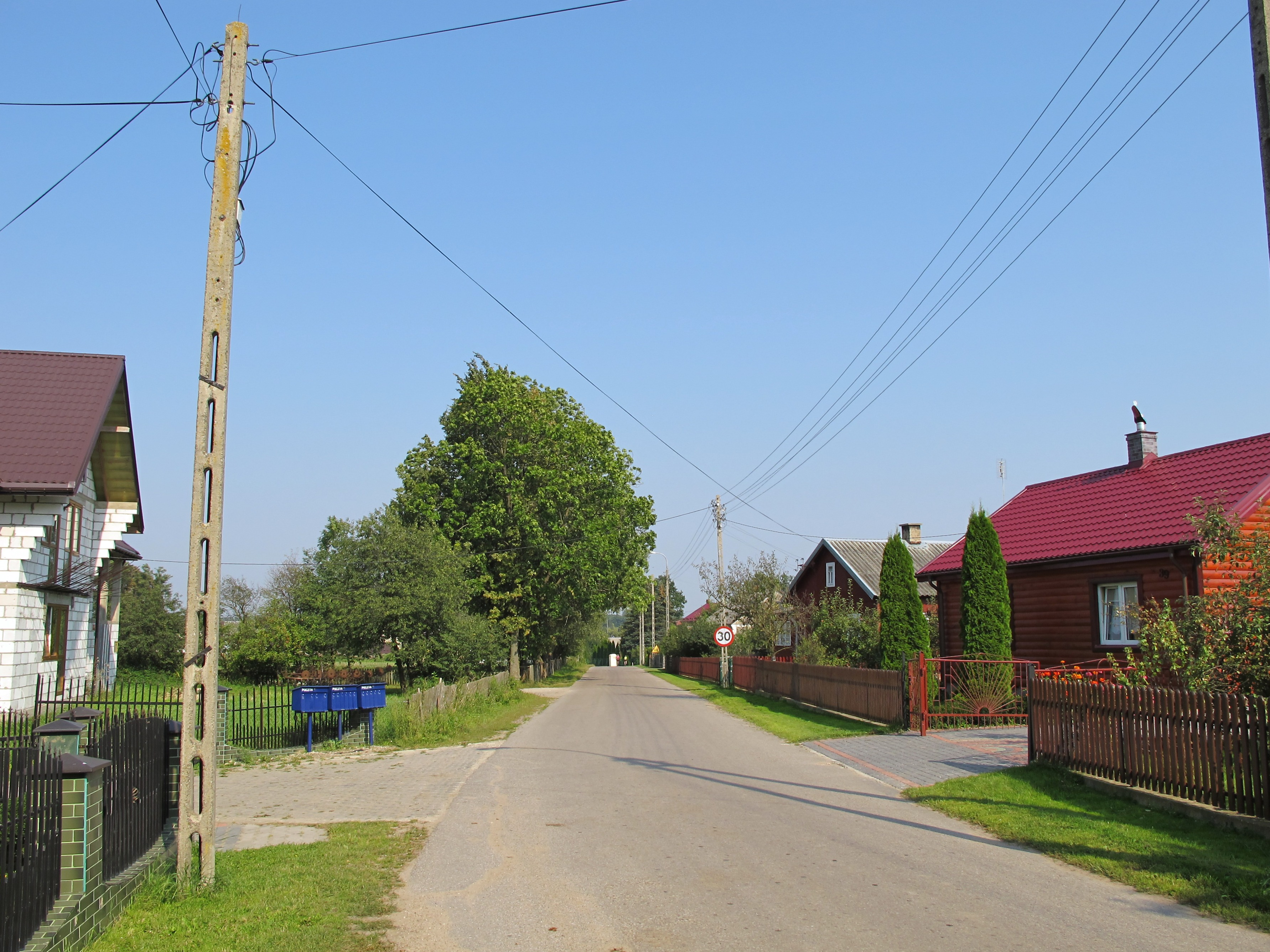

- Location within Poland
- Coordinates: 52°59′N 22°39′E
- Country: Poland
- Voivodeship: Podlaskie
- County: Wysokie Mazowieckie
- Gmina: Sokoły

Bruszewo [bruˈʂɛvɔ] is a village in the administrative district of Gmina Sokoły, within Wysokie Mazowieckie County, Podlaskie Voivodeship, in north-eastern Poland.
