= Sokoły, Wysokie Mazowieckie County =

Sokoły
- Village
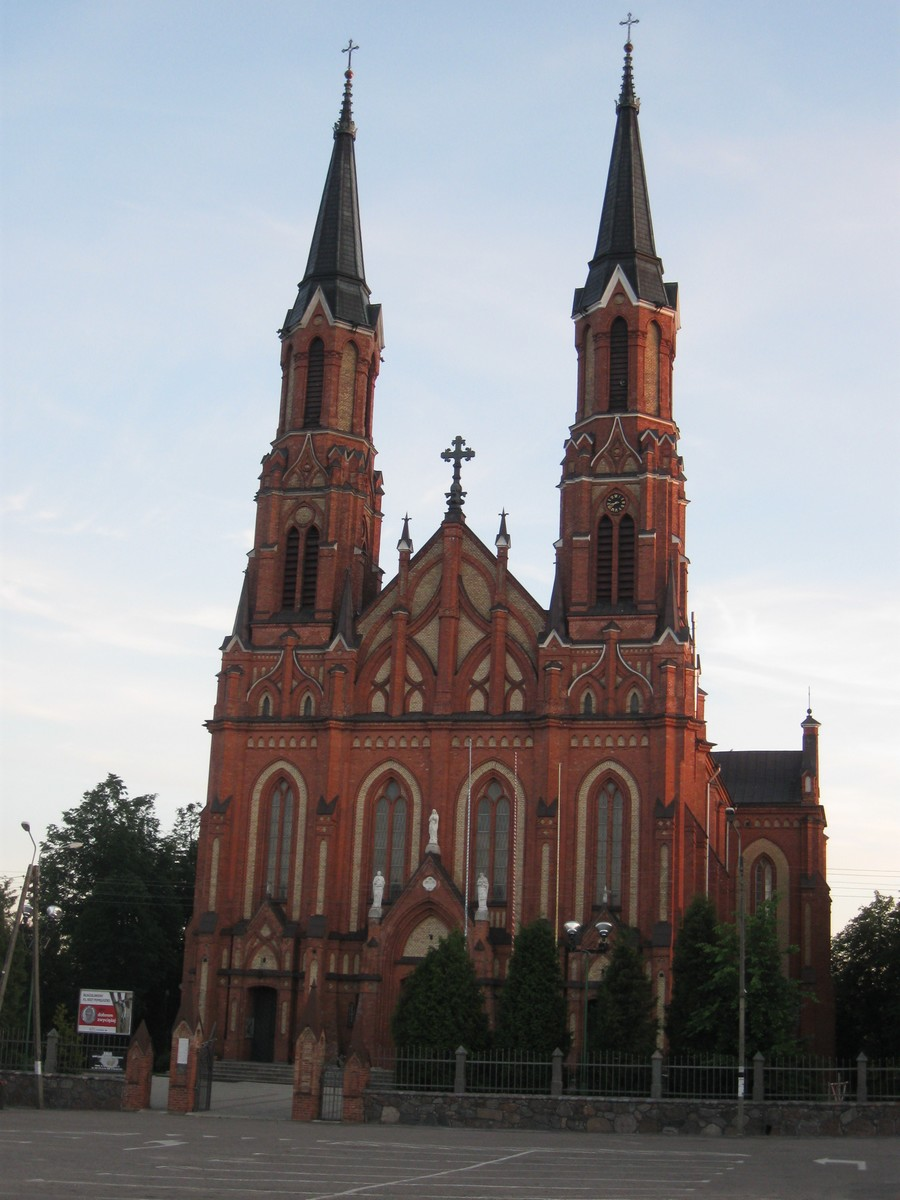
- Basilica of the Assumption of the Virgin Mary

- Location within Poland
- Coordinates: 52°59′34″N 22°42′2″E
- Country: Poland
- Voivodeship: Podlaskie
- County: Wysokie Mazowieckie
- Gmina: Sokoły

Population
  - Total: 1,450

Sokoły [sɔˈkɔwɨ] is a village in Wysokie Mazowieckie County, Podlaskie Voivodeship, in north-eastern Poland. It is the seat of the gmina (administrative district) called Gmina Sokoły.
