= Nowe Wykno =

- Village
- Location within Poland
- Coordinates: 53°00′19″N 22°29′45″E
- Country: Poland
- Voivodeship: Podlaskie
- County: Wysokie Mazowieckie
- Gmina: Kulesze Kościelne

Nowe Wykno [ˈnɔvɛ ˈvɨknɔ] is a village in the administrative district of Gmina Kulesze Kościelne, within Wysokie Mazowieckie County, Podlaskie Voivodeship, in north-eastern Poland.
