= Stare Wykno =

- Village
- Location within Poland
- Coordinates: 53°00′29″N 22°28′54″E
- Country: Poland
- Voivodeship: Podlaskie
- County: Wysokie Mazowieckie
- Gmina: Kulesze Kościelne

Stare Wykno [ˈstarɛ ˈvɨknɔ] is a village in the administrative district of Gmina Kulesze Kościelne, within Wysokie Mazowieckie County, Podlaskie Voivodeship, in north-eastern Poland.
