= Kulesze Kościelne =

- Village
- Location within Poland
- Coordinates: 53°2′N 22°30′E
- Country: Poland
- Voivodeship: Podlaskie
- County: Wysokie Mazowieckie
- Gmina: Kulesze Kościelne

Kulesze Kościelne [kuˈlɛʂɛ kɔɕˈt͡ɕɛlnɛ] is a village in Wysokie Mazowieckie County, Podlaskie Voivodeship, in north-eastern Poland. It is the seat of the gmina (administrative district) called Gmina Kulesze Kościelne.

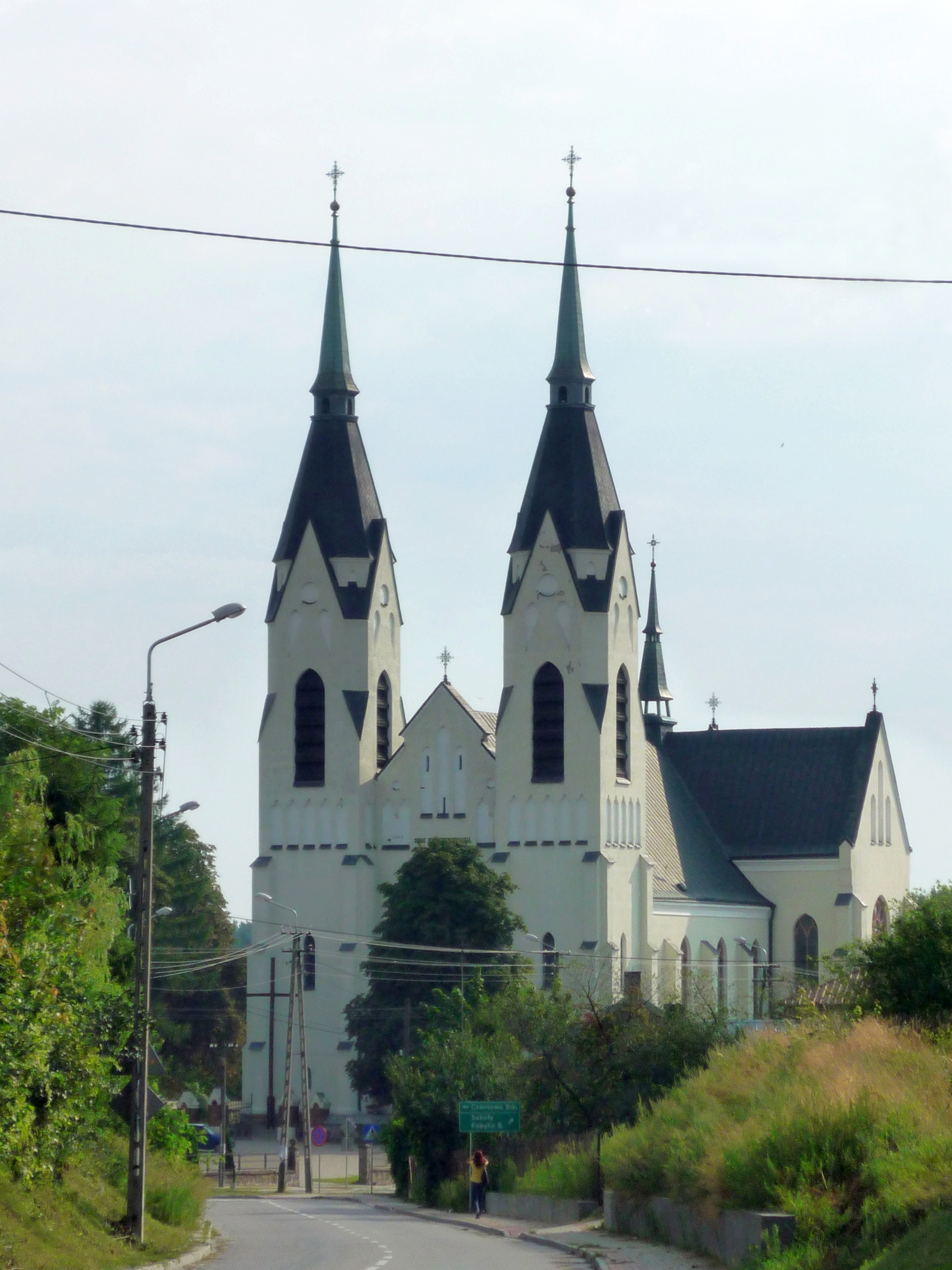
Saint Bartholomew Church
