= Faszcze, Gmina Kulesze Kościelne =

Faszcze
- Village
- Location within Poland
- Coordinates: 52°58′54″N 22°36′1″E
- Country: Poland
- Voivodeship: Podlaskie
- County: Wysokie Mazowieckie
- Gmina: Kulesze Kościelne

Faszcze [ˈfaʂt͡ʂɛ] is a village in the administrative district of Gmina Kulesze Kościelne, within Wysokie Mazowieckie County, Podlaskie Voivodeship, in north-eastern Poland.
