= Pęzy =

- Village
- Location within Poland
- Coordinates: 52°57′06″N 22°42′40″E
- Country: Poland
- Voivodeship: Podlaskie
- County: Wysokie Mazowieckie
- Gmina: Sokoły

Pęzy [ˈpɛ̃zɨ] is a village in the administrative district of Gmina Sokoły, within Wysokie Mazowieckie County, Podlaskie Voivodeship, in north-eastern Poland.
