= Idźki-Wykno =

Village in Gmina Sokoły, Poland

- Village
- Location within Poland
- Coordinates: 53°00′11″N 22°41′34″E
- Country: Poland
- Voivodeship: Podlaskie
- County: Wysokie Mazowieckie
- Gmina: Sokoły

Idźki-Wykno [ˈit͡ɕki ˈvɨknɔ] is a village in the administrative district of Gmina Sokoły, within Wysokie Mazowieckie County, Podlaskie Voivodeship, in north-eastern Poland.
