= Lajos Kossuth =

Hungarian statesman (1802–1894)

Noble Lajos Kossuth de Udvard et Kossuthfalva
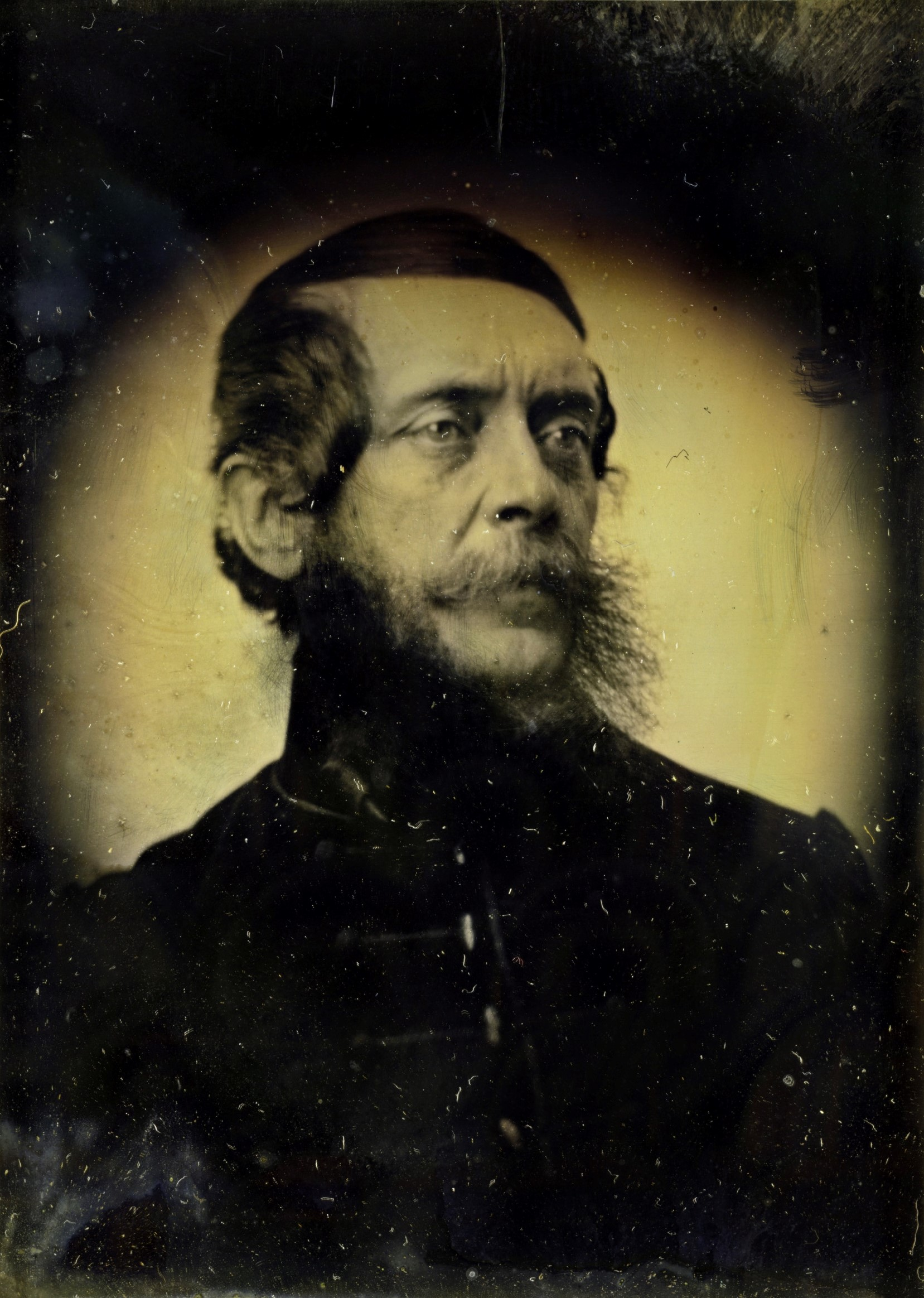
- Daguerreotype portrait by Southworth & Hawes, May 1852

Governor-President of the Hungarian State
- In office 14 April 1849 – 11 August 1849
- Monarch: Vacant (Note: The Constitution of 1849 did not recognize the claim of Franz Joseph I to the Hungarian throne.)
- Prime Minister: Bertalan Szemere
- Preceded by: Position established
- Succeeded by: Artúr Görgei (acting)

2nd Prime Minister of the Kingdom of Hungary (Note: De jure head of government as president of the Committee of National Defence.)
- De facto
- In office 2 October 1848 – 1 May 1849
- Monarch: Ferdinand V (Note: The Hungarian assembly did not recognize the claim of Franz Joseph I to the Hungarian throne after Ferdinand's resignation.)
- Deputy: Pál Nyáry
- Preceded by: Lajos Batthyány
- Succeeded by: Bertalan Szemere

Commander-in-chief of the Hungarian Revolutionary Army (Note: Ex officio as president of the Committee of National Defence from 2 October 1848 to 2 May 1849, then as governor of Hungary until 11 August 1849.)
- In office 2 October 1848 – 11 August 1849
- Supreme Commander: János Móga; Artúr Görgei; Henryk Dembiński; Antal Vetter; Lázár Mészáros; Józef Bem
- Preceded by: Lajos Batthyány
- Succeeded by: Artúr Görgei

1st Minister of Finance of the Kingdom of Hungary
- In office 7 April 1848 – 12 September 1848
- Prime Minister: Lajos Batthyány
- Preceded by: Position established
- Succeeded by: Lajos Batthyány

Personal details
- Born: 19 September 1802 Monok, Habsburg Hungary
- Died: 20 March 1894 (aged 91) Turin, Italy
- Resting place: Kerepesi Cemetery, Budapest
- Citizenship: Hungary (until 8 January 1890); Stateless (since 8 January 1890)
- Party: Opposition Party
- Children: 2, including Ferenc
- Relatives: Juraj Košút (uncle)
- Education: University of Pest
- Occupation: Lawyer; Politician; Diplomat; Journalist
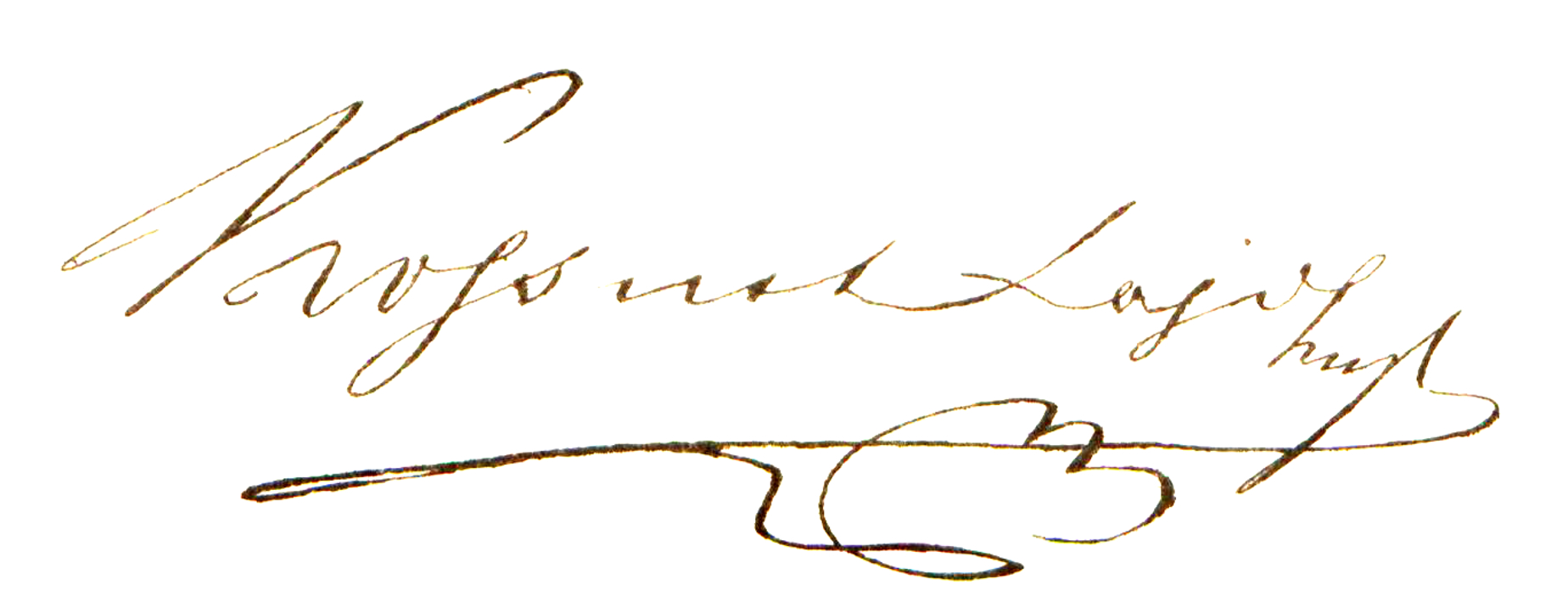
- Signature
- Lajos Kossuth's voice Recorded 20 September 1890

Lajos Kossuth de Udvard et Kossuthfalva (Hungarian: [ˈlɒjoʃ ˈkoʃut]; Hungarian: udvardi és kossuthfalvi Kossuth Lajos; Slovak: Ľudovít Košút; English: Louis Kossuth; 19 September 1802 – 20 March 1894) was a Hungarian nobleman, lawyer, journalist, politician, statesman, revolutionist and governor-president of the Hungarian State during the war of independence of 1848–1849.

Kossuth, a gifted public speaker, rose from a lesser noble (gentry) background to become regent-president during the 1848–1849 Hungarian revolution. American journalist Horace Greeley said of Kossuth: "Among the orators, patriots, statesmen, exiles, he has, living or dead, no superior."

Kossuth's powerful speeches so impressed and touched American orator Daniel Webster, that he wrote a book about Kossuth's life. During his lifetime, Kossuth was publicly honored in countries such as Great Britain and the United States, where he was viewed by some supporters as a symbol of democratic movements in Europe. A bronze bust if Kossuth is in the United States Capitol with the inscription: Father of Hungarian Democracy, Hungarian Statesman, Freedom Fighter, 1848–1849. Friedrich Engels considered him to be "a truly revolutionary figure, a man who in the name of his people dares to accept the challenge of a desperate struggle, who for his nation is Danton and Carnot in one person ...".

== Early years ==
Lajos Kossuth was born into an untitled lower noble (gentry) family in Monok, Kingdom of Hungary, a small town in the county of Zemplén in modern-day Borsod-Abaúj-Zemplén County of Northern Hungary. He was the eldest of five children in a Lutheran noble family of Slovak origin. His father, László Kossuth (1762–1839), belonged to the lower nobility, had a small estate and was a lawyer by profession. László had two brothers (Simon Kossuth and György Kossuth) and one sister, Johanna.

The family moved from Monok to Olaszliszka in 1803, and then to Sátoraljaújhely in 1808. Lajos had four younger sisters including Zsuzsanna.

Lajos' mother, Karolina, raised her children as strict Lutherans. As a result of their mixed ancestry, and as was quite common during his era, her children spoke three languages – Hungarian, German and Slovak – even in their early childhood.

Lajos studied at the Piarist college of Sátoraljaújhely and the Calvinist college of Sárospatak (for one year) and the University of Pest (now Budapest). At nineteen he entered his father's legal practice. Between 1824 and 1832 he practiced law in his native Zemplén County. His legal and political career advanced steadily, partly due to family connections, as his father, who was a lawyer for several higher aristocratic families, and thus involved his son in the administration, and his son soon took over some of his father's work. He first became a lawyer in the Lutheran parish of Sátoraljaújhely, in 1827 he became a judge, and later he became a prosecutor in Sátoraljaújhely. During this time, in addition to his office work, he made historical chronologies and translations. In the national census of 1828, in which taxpayers were counted in order to eliminate tax disparities, Kossuth assisted in the organization of the census of Zemplén county. He was popular locally, and having been appointed steward to the countess Szapáry, a widow with large estates, he became her voting representative in the county assembly and settled in Pest. He was subsequently dismissed on the grounds of some misunderstanding in regards to estate funds.

== Ancestry ==
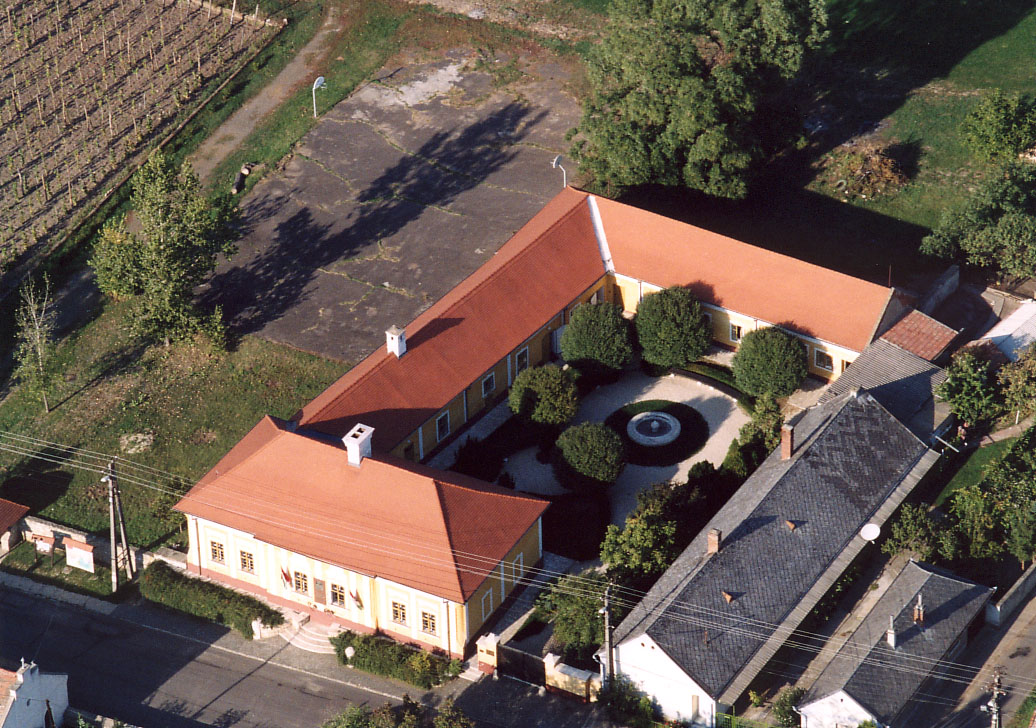
The house in Monok where Kossuth was born

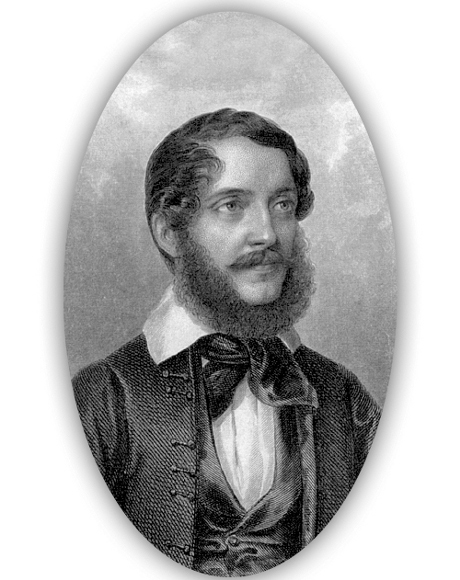
Lajos Kossuth's earliest known portrait (1838)

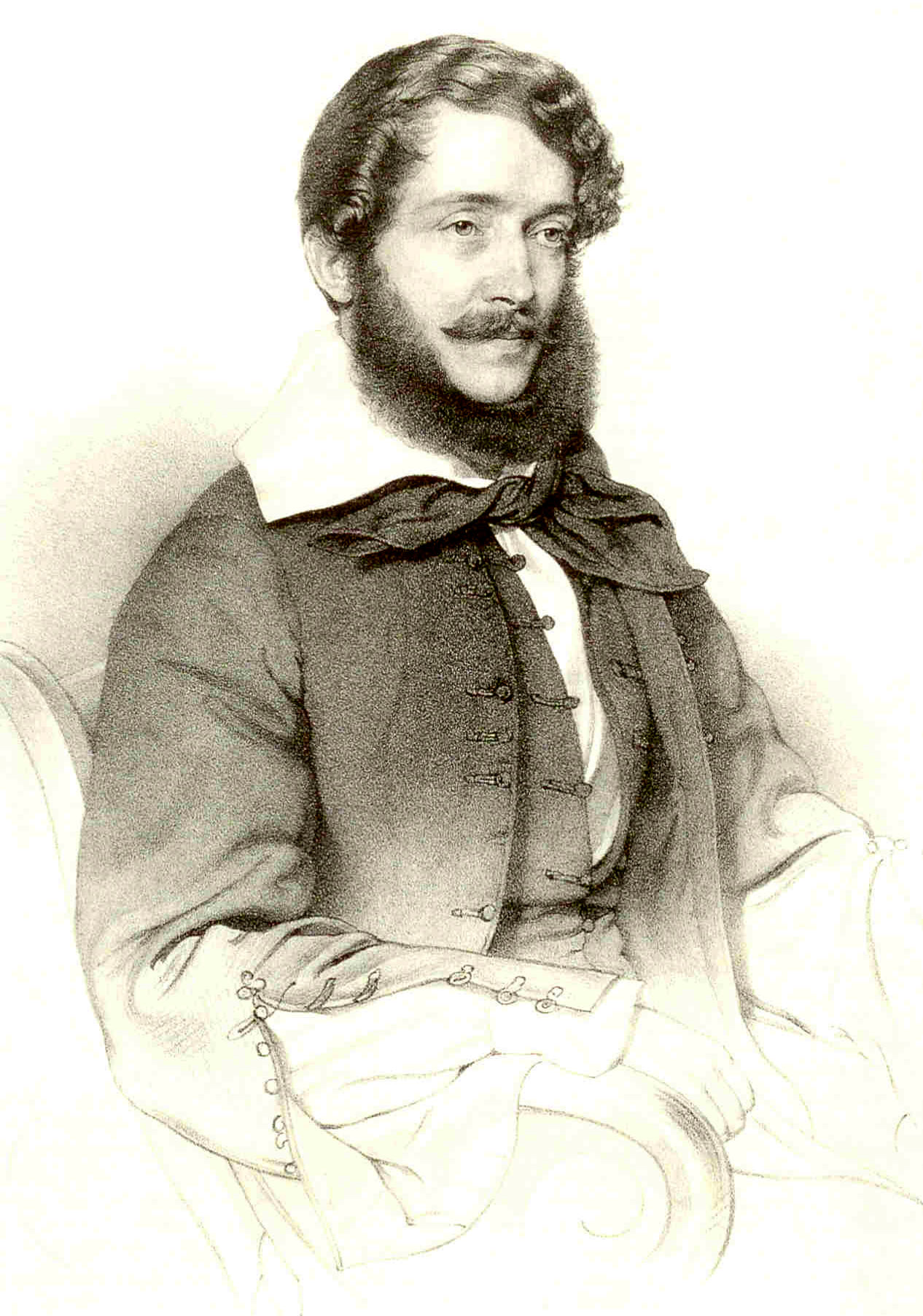
Lajos Kossuth in 1842

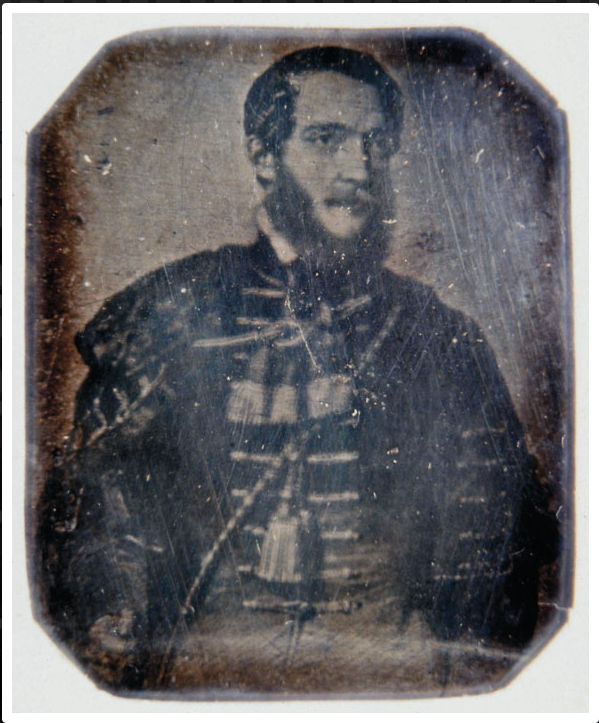
Early photograph of Lajos Kossuth (1847) Daguerreotype

The House of Kossuth, into which Lajos was born, originated from the county of Turóc (now partially Turiec region, Košúty, north-central Slovakia). They acquired the rank of nobility in 1263 from King Béla IV. The Kossuths married into the Zathureczky, Nedeczky, Borcsány, and Prónay families, amongst others. Lajos Kossuth's paternal grandmother was a Beniczky and her Beniczky ancestors had married into the following families: Farkas, Zmeskal (one-eight Polish ancestry); Révay, Pajor (one-quarter German Baierle Magyarized to Pajor); and finally, Prónay. Lajos Kossuth's mother, Karolina Weber (1770–1853), was born to a Lutheran family (Kaltensteìn-Hidegkövy) of three-quarters-German and Magyarized-German (with one-quarter of their descent unknown), living in Upper Hungary (today partially Slovakia).

Ancestry of Lajos Kossuth
Lajos Kossuth	László Kossuth de Udvard (Kossut, 23 June 1765– Alsódabas, 13 March 1839) uradalmi ügyész (financial and legal supervisor of a manor)	Pál Kossuth de Udvard (Kisraksa, 20 May 1738 – 1791) a táblabíró (county court judge) in Turóc County	György Kossuth de Udvard
Lajos Kossuth	László Kossuth de Udvard (Kossut, 23 June 1765– Alsódabas, 13 March 1839) uradalmi ügyész (financial and legal supervisor of a manor)	Pál Kossuth de Udvard (Kisraksa, 20 May 1738 – 1791) a táblabíró (county court judge) in Turóc County	Katalin Raksányi de Raksa (1701 – Kisraksa, 8 November 1759)
Lajos Kossuth	László Kossuth de Udvard (Kossut, 23 June 1765– Alsódabas, 13 March 1839) uradalmi ügyész (financial and legal supervisor of a manor)	Beniczky Zsuzsánna de Benicze et Micsinye (Pribóc, 10 January 1737 – ?)	Péter Beniczky de Benicze et Micsinye
Lajos Kossuth	László Kossuth de Udvard (Kossut, 23 June 1765– Alsódabas, 13 March 1839) uradalmi ügyész (financial and legal supervisor of a manor)	Beniczky Zsuzsánna de Benicze et Micsinye (Pribóc, 10 January 1737 – ?)	Éva Prónay de Tótpróna et Blatnica
Lajos Kossuth	Karolina Weber de Tyrling (Liszka, 1770 – Brussels, 28 December 1852)	András Weber de Tyrling postmaster	unknown
Lajos Kossuth	Karolina Weber de Tyrling (Liszka, 1770 – Brussels, 28 December 1852)	András Weber de Tyrling postmaster	unknown
Lajos Kossuth	Karolina Weber de Tyrling (Liszka, 1770 – Brussels, 28 December 1852)	noble Erzsébet Hidegkövy (Kaltenstein)	noble Tóbiás Hidegkövy (Kaltenstein; born in Sátoraljaújhely), pharmacist
Lajos Kossuth	Karolina Weber de Tyrling (Liszka, 1770 – Brussels, 28 December 1852)	noble Erzsébet Hidegkövy (Kaltenstein)	Anna Mária Musczler

== Entry into national politics ==
Shortly after his dismissal by Countess Szapáry, Kossuth was appointed as deputy to Count Hunyady at the Diet of Hungary. The Diet met during 1825–27 and 1832–36 in Pressburg (Pozsony, present Bratislava), then capital of Hungary.

Only the upper aristocracy could vote in the House of Magnates (similar to the British House of Lords) and Kossuth took little part in the debates as a deputy of Count Hunyady. At the time, a struggle to reassert a Hungarian national identity was beginning to emerge under leaders such as Miklós Wesselényi and the Széchenyis. In part, it was also a struggle for fundamental economic and political and societal reforms against the stagnant and conservative Austrian government. Kossuth's duties to Count Hunyady included reporting on Diet proceedings in writing, as the Austrian government, fearing popular dissent, had banned published reports.

The high quality of Kossuth's letters led to their being circulated in manuscript among other liberal magnates. Readership demands led him to edit an organized parliamentary gazette (Országgyűlési tudósítások); spreading his name and influence further. Orders from the Official Censor halted circulation by lithograph printing. Distribution in manuscript by post was forbidden by the government, although circulation by hand continued.

In 1836, the Diet was dissolved. Kossuth continued to report (in letter form), covering the debates of the county assemblies. The newfound publicity gave the assemblies national political prominence. Previously, they had had little idea of each other's proceedings. His embellishment of the speeches from the liberals and reformers enhanced the impact of his newsletters. After the prohibition of his parliamentary gazette, Kossuth loudly demanded the legal declaration of freedom of the press and of speech in Hungary and in the entire Habsburg Empire. The government attempted in vain to suppress the letters, and, other means having failed, he was arrested in May 1837, with Wesselényi and several others, on a charge of high treason.

After spending a year in prison at Buda awaiting trial, he was condemned to four more years' imprisonment. Kossuth and his friend Count Miklós Wesselényi were placed in separated solitary cells. Count Wesselényi's cell did not have even a window, and he went blind in the darkness. Kossuth, however, had a small window and with the help of a politically well-informed young woman, Theresa Meszlényi, he remained informed about political events. Meszlényi lied to the prison commander, telling him she and Kossuth were engaged. In reality, Kossuth did not know Meszlényi before his imprisonment, but this permitted her to visit. Meszlényi also provided books. Strict confinement damaged Kossuth's health, but he spent much time reading. He greatly increased his political knowledge and acquired fluency in English from study of the King James Version of the Bible and William Shakespeare which he henceforth always spoke with a certain archaic eloquence. While Wesselényi was broken mentally, Kossuth, supported by Terézia Meszlényi's frequent visits, emerged from prison in much better condition. His arrest had caused great controversy. The Diet, which reconvened in 1839, demanded the release of the political prisoners and refused to pass any government measures. Austrian chancellor Metternich long remained obdurate, but the danger of war in 1840 obliged him to give way.

=== Marriage and children ===
On the day of his release from the prison, Kossuth and Meszlényi were married, and she remained a firm supporter of his politics. She was a Catholic and her Church refused to bless the marriage since Kossuth, a proud Protestant, would not convert. At the time of their marriage it was unheard of that people of different religions married. According to the traditional practice, the bride or more rarely the fiancé had to convert to the religion of his or her spouse before the wedding ceremony. However Kossuth refused to convert to Roman Catholicism, and Meszlényi also refused to convert to Lutheranism. Their mixed religious marriage caused a great scandal at the time. This experience influenced Kossuth's firm defense of mixed marriages. The couple had three children: Ferenc Lajos Ákos (1841–1914), Minister for Trade between 1906 and 1910; Vilma (1843–1862); and Lajos Tódor Károly (1844–1918).

== Journalist and political leader ==
Kossuth gained national prominence and public recognition during this period. He regained full health in January 1841. In January 1841 he became editor of the Pesti Hírlap. The job was offered to him by Lajos Landerer, the owner of a big printing house company in Pest (in fact, Landerer was an undercover agent of the Vienna secret police). The government circles and the secret police believed that censorship and financial interests would curtail Kossuth's opposition, and they did not consider the small circulation of the paper to be dangerous anyway. However, Kossuth played a significant role in shaping modern Hungarian political journalism. His editorials dealt with the pressing problems of the economy, the social injustices and the existing legal inequality of the common people. The articles combined a critique of the present with an outline of the future, combining and supplementing the reform ideas that had emerged up to that point into a coherent programme. The paper achieved unprecedented success, soon reaching the then immense circulation of 7000 copies. A competing pro-government newspaper, Világ(World), started up, but despite its attacks against Kossuth's ideas, it became counterproductive, and it only served to increase Kossuth's visibility and add to the general political fervor.

Kossuth's ideas stand on the enlightened Western European type liberal nationalism (based on the "jus soli" principle, that is the complete opposite of the typical Eastern European ethnic nationalism, which was based on "jus sanguinis").

Kossuth followed the ideas of the French nation state ideology, which was a ruling liberal idea of his era. Accordingly, he considered and regarded automatically everybody as "Hungarian" – regardless of their mother tongue and ethnic ancestry – who were born and lived in the territory of Hungary. He even quoted King Stephen I of Hungary's admonition: "A nation of one language and the same customs is weak and fragile."

Kossuth pleaded in the newspaper Pesti Hírlap for rapid Magyarization: "Let us hurry, let us hurry to Magyarize the Croats, the Romanians, and the Saxons, for otherwise we shall perish". In 1842 he argued that Hungarian had to be the exclusive language in public life. He also stated that "in one country it is impossible to speak in a hundred different languages. There must be one language and in Hungary this must be Hungarian".

Kossuth's assimilatory ambitions were disapproved by Zsigmond Kemény, though he supported a multinational state led by Hungarians. István Széchenyi criticized Kossuth for "pitting one nationality against another". He publicly warned Kossuth that his appeals to the passions of the people would lead the nation to revolution. Kossuth, undaunted, did not stop at the publicly reasoned reforms demanded by all Liberals: the abolition of entail, the abolition of feudal burdens and taxation of the nobles. He went on to broach the possibility of separating from the House of Habsburg. By combining this nationalism with an insistence on the superiority of the Hungarian culture to the culture of Slavonic inhabitants of Hungary, he sowed the seeds of both the collapse of Hungary in 1849 and his own political demise.

In 1844, Kossuth was dismissed from Pesti Hírlap after a dispute with the proprietor over salary. It is believed that the dispute was rooted in government intrigue. Kossuth was unable to obtain permission to start his own newspaper. In a personal interview, Metternich offered to take him into the government service. Kossuth refused and spent the next three years without a regular position. He continued to agitate on behalf of both political and commercial independence for Hungary. He adopted the economic principles of Friedrich List, and was the founder of the popular "Védegylet" society whose members consumed only Hungarian industrial products. He also argued for the creation of a Hungarian port at Fiume.

Kossuth played a major role in the formation of the Opposition Party in 1847, whose programme was essentially formulated by him.

In autumn 1847, Kossuth was able to take his final key step. The support of Lajos Batthyány during a keenly fought campaign made him be elected to the new Diet as member for Pest. He proclaimed: "Now that I am a deputy, I will cease to be an agitator." He immediately became chief leader of the Opposition Party. Ferenc Deák was absent. As Headlam noted, his political rivals, Batthyány, István Széchenyi, Szemere, and József Eötvös, believed:

his intense personal ambition and egoism led him always to assume the chief place, and to use his parliamentary position to establish himself as leader of the nation; but before his eloquence and energy all apprehensions were useless. His eloquence was of that nature, in its impassioned appeals to the strongest emotions, that it required for its full effect the highest themes and the most dramatic situations. In a time of rest, though he could never have been obscure, he would never have attained the highest power. It was therefore a necessity of his nature, perhaps unconsciously, always to drive things to a crisis. The crisis came, and he used it to the full.

=== The "long debate" of reformers in the press ===
Count Széchenyi judged the reform system of Kossuth in a pamphlet, Kelet Népe from 1841. According to Széchenyi, economic, political and social reforms must be instituted slowly and carefully so that Hungary would avoid the violent interference of the Habsburg dynasty. Széchenyi was listening to the spread of the expansion of Kossuth's ideas in Hungarian society, which did not consider good relations with the Habsburg dynasty. Kossuth believed that society could not be forced into a passive role by any reason through social change. According to Kossuth, the wider social movements can not be continually excluded from political life. Behind Kossuth's conception of society was a notion of freedom that emphasized the unitary origin of rights, which he saw manifested in universal suffrage. In exercising political rights, Széchenyi took into account wealth and education of the citizens, thus he supported only limited suffrage similar to the Western European (British, French and Belgian) limited suffrage of the era. In 1885, Kossuth called Széchenyi a liberal elitist aristocrat while Széchenyi considered himself to be a democrat.

Széchenyi was an isolationist politician while, according to Kossuth, strong relations and collaboration with international liberal and progressive movements are essential for the success of liberty. Regarding foreign policy, Kossuth and his followers refused the isolationist policy of Széchenyi, thus they stood on the ground of the liberal internationalism: They supported countries and political forces that aligned with their moral and political standards. They also believed that governments and political movements sharing the same modern liberal values should form an alliance against the "feudal type" of monarchies.

Széchenyi's economic policy based on Anglo-Saxon free-market principles, while Kossuth supported the protective tariffs due to the weaker Hungarian industrial sector. Kossuth wanted to build a rapidly industrialized country in his vision while Széchenyi wanted to preserve the traditionally strong agricultural sector as the main character of the economy.

== Work in the government ==
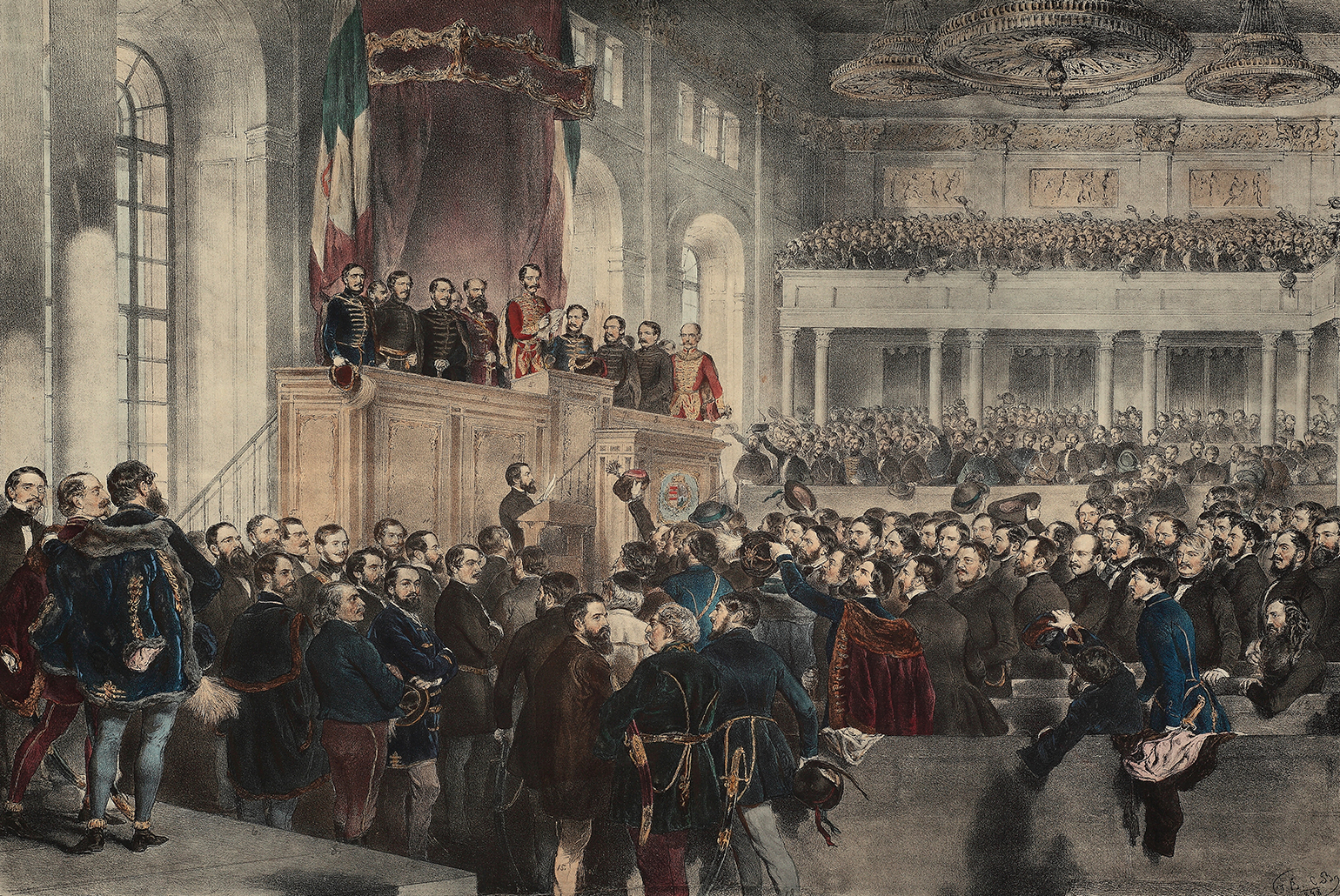
5 July 1848: The opening ceremony of the first parliament, which was based on popular representation. Batthyány, Kossuth and other members of the first responsible government are on the balcony.

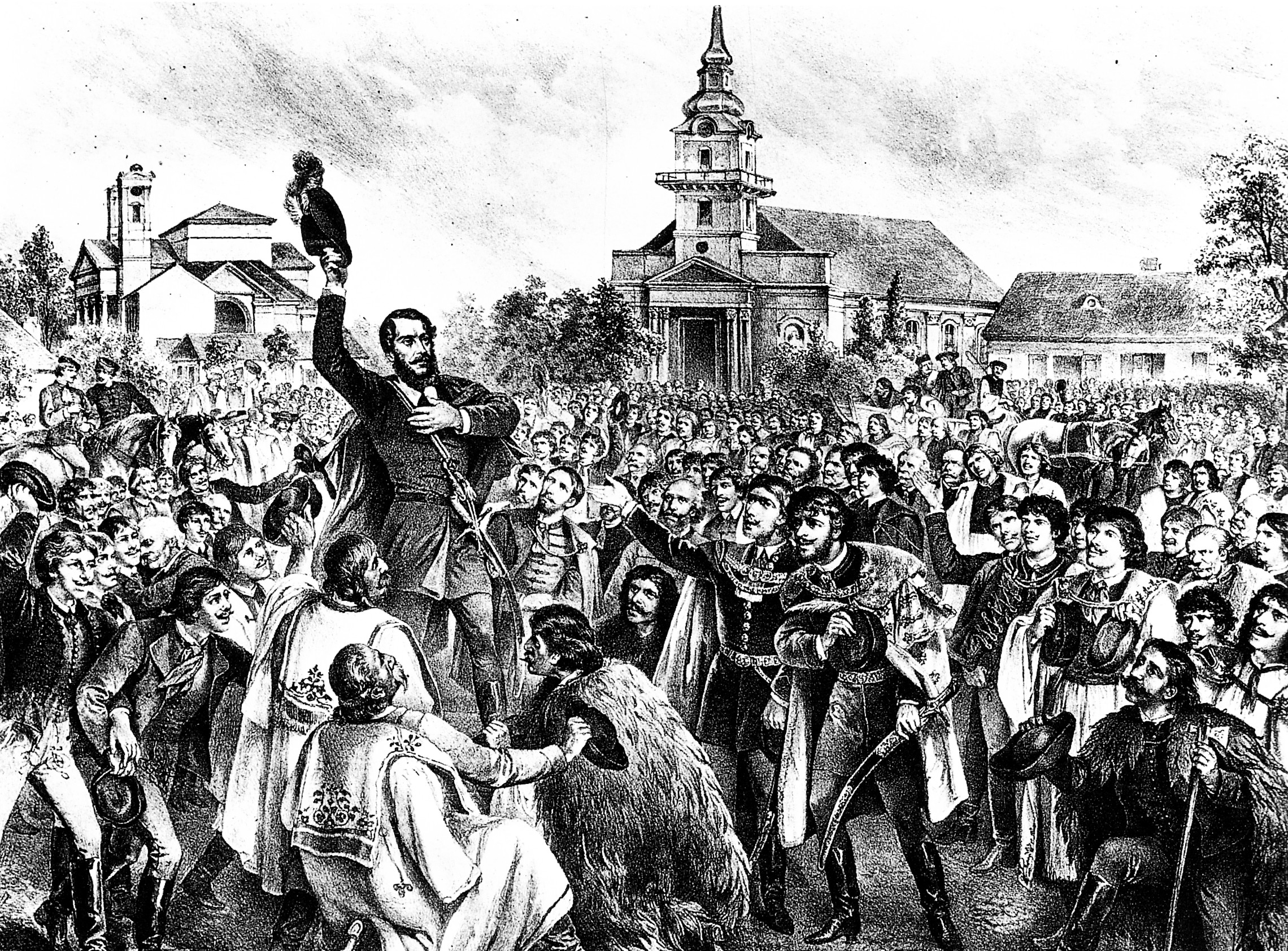
Kossuth inspired many Hungarians to rise up against the Austrian Empire in a speech he made in the town of Cegléd on 24 September 1848.

=== Minister of Finance ===
The crisis came, and he used it to the full. On 3 March 1848, shortly after the news of the revolution in Paris had arrived, in a speech of surpassing power he demanded parliamentary government for Hungary and constitutional government for the rest of Austria.

He appealed to the hope of the Habsburgs, "our beloved Archduke Franz Joseph" (then seventeen years old), to perpetuate the ancient glory of the dynasty by meeting half-way the aspirations of a free people. He at once became the leader of the European revolution; his speech was read aloud in the streets of Vienna to the mob which overthrew Metternich (13 March); when a deputation from the Diet visited Vienna to receive the assent of Emperor Ferdinand to their petition, Kossuth received the chief ovation. While Viennese masses celebrated Kossuth (and from the Diet in Pressburg a delegation went to Buda and sent the news of the Austrian Revolution) as their hero, revolution broke out in Buda on 15 March; Kossuth traveled home immediately. On 17 March 1848 the Emperor assented and Lajos Batthyány created the first Hungarian government, that was not anymore responsible to the King, but to the elected members of the Diet. On 23 March 1848, Pm. Batthyány commended his government to the Diet. In the new government Kossuth was appointed as the Minister of Finance.

He began developing the internal resources of the country: re-establishing a separate Hungarian coinage, and using every means to increase national self-consciousness. Characteristically, the new Hungarian bank notes had Kossuth's name as the most prominent inscription; making reference to "Kossuth Notes" a future byword.

A new paper was started, to which was given the name of Kossuth Hirlapja, so that from the first it was Kossuth rather than the Palatine or prime minister Batthyány whose name was in the minds of the people associated with the new government. Much more was this the case when, in the summer, the dangers from the Croats, Serbs and the reaction at Vienna increased.

In a speech on 11 July he asked that the nation should arm in self-defense, and demanded 200,000 men; amid a scene of wild enthusiasm this was granted by acclamation. However the danger had been exacerbated by Kossuth himself through appealing exclusively to the Magyar notables rather than including the other subject minorities of the Habsburg empire too. The Austrians, meanwhile, successfully used the other minorities as allies against the Magyar uprising.

While Croatian ban Josip Jelačić was marching on Pest, the Hungarian government was in serious military crisis due to the lack of soldiers, Kossuth used his popularity, he went from town to town rousing the people to the defense of the country, and the popular force of the Honvéd was his creation. When Batthyány resigned he was appointed with Szemere to carry on the government provisionally, and at the end of September he was made President of the Committee of National Defense. Prime minister Lajos Batthyány's desperate attempts to mediate with the Viennese royal court to achieve reconciliation and restore peace were no longer successful. Due to his unsuccessful peace missions, Batthyány slowly began to become politically isolated and increasingly lost the support of the parliament.

On 6 September, Kossuth ordered the first Hungarian banknotes to be issued to cover defence expenses.

In early September 1848, after the Habsburg King of Hungary, Ferdinand V, compelled the Batthyány government to resign, the nation found itself once more bereft of executive authority.

The government meeting of 11 September, under Kossuth's leadership, adopted revolutionary decisions on finance and the military to defend the invaded homeland. Another attempt by Batthyány to form a cabinet failed, and Kossuth declared that until another government was appointed, he would retain his position as finance minister.

According to legend, it was in this year that Kossuth was attacked by the country's most famous betyár, Sándor Rózsa. According to the story, Kossuth was on his way to Cegléd in a horse-drawn carriage when the bandit leader attacked him, but he kept his temper and persuaded him to join the national cause and stop robbing. The story might even be true, as Kossuth granted amnesty to the criminal on 23 October, who inturn launched an independent rebel group with 150 armed horsemen. Both men inspired legends in their time that are still alive today. In popular poetry, Rózsa is seen as a Robin Hood-like character, while Kossuth was the personification of the nation. Also, the Serbs referred to him as King Kossuth, whose carriage was said to be drawn by 600 horses.

=== President of the OHB ===
Subsequent to 28 September, the National Defence Committee (Országos Honvédelmi Bizottmány, or OHB) assumed the reins of power, initially in a provisional capacity and then, upon a parliamentary decree issued on 8 October, in a permanent manner for wartime. Lajos Kossuth was elected president of the OHB, which operated as the de facto government.

Already on 14 September, a rapidly growing number of his supporters called in parliament for Kossuth to be given temporary dictatorial powers because of the critical and desperate war situation.

=== Regent-President of Hungary ===
On 7 December 1848, the Diet of Hungary formally refused to acknowledge the title of the new king, Franz Joseph I, "as without the knowledge and consent of the diet no one could sit on the Hungarian throne" and called the nation to arms. From a legal point of view, according to the coronation oath, a crowned Hungarian King could not relinquish the Hungarian throne during his life; if the king was alive and unable to do his duty as ruler, a governor (or regent with proper English terminology) had to deputize the royal duties. Constitutionally, his uncle, Ferdinand remained still the legal King of Hungary. If there was no possibility to inherit the throne automatically due to the death of the predecessor king (as Ferdinand was still alive), but the monarch wanted to relinquish his throne and appoint another king before his death, technically only one legal solution remained: the Diet had the power to depose the king and elect his successor as the new King of Hungary. Due to the legal and military tensions, the Hungarian parliament did not make that decision for Franz Joseph.

For the first time in the revolutionary movements of 1848, for the first time since 1793, a nation surrounded by superior counterrevolutionary forces dares to counter the cowardly counterrevolutionary fury by revolutionary passion, the terreur blanche by the terreur rouge.

For the first time after a long period we meet with a truly revolutionary figure, a man who in the name of his people dares to accept the challenge of desperate struggle, who for his nation is Danton and Carnot in one person – Lajos Kossuth

— Friedrich Engels about Kossuth (January 1849)

From this time he had increased amounts of power. The direction of the whole government was in his hands. Without military experience, he had to control and direct the movements of armies; he was unable to keep control over the generals or to establish that military co-operation so essential to success. Arthur Görgey in particular, whose great abilities Kossuth was the first to recognize, refused obedience; the two men were very different personalities. Twice Kossuth removed him from command; twice he had to restore him.

==== Declaration of Independence ====
The House of Lorraine-Habsburg is unexampled in the compass of its perjuries ... Its determination to extinguish the independence of Hungary has been accompanied by a succession of criminal acts, comprising robbery, destruction of property by fire, murder, maiming ... Humanity will shudder when reading this disgraceful page of history. [...] "The house of Habsburg has forfeited the throne".

— Kossuth, In Liszt, The Weimar Years

The Hungarian Declaration of Independence declared the independence of Hungary from the Habsburg Dynasty during the Hungarian Revolution of 1848. The Hungarian parliament declared it at the Great Calvinist Church of Debrecen on 14 April 1849.

The text did not frame this act as "secession from the Austrian Empire" (established in 1804), because the Kingdom of Hungary had never been constitutionally part of that empire.

This event gave to the revolt an excuse of legality. Actually, from this time until the collapse of the revolution, Lajos Kossuth (as elected regent-president) became the de facto and de jure ruler of Hungary.

The declaration of Hungarian independence was made possible by the positive mood created by the military successes of the Spring Campaign.

==== Minority rights ====
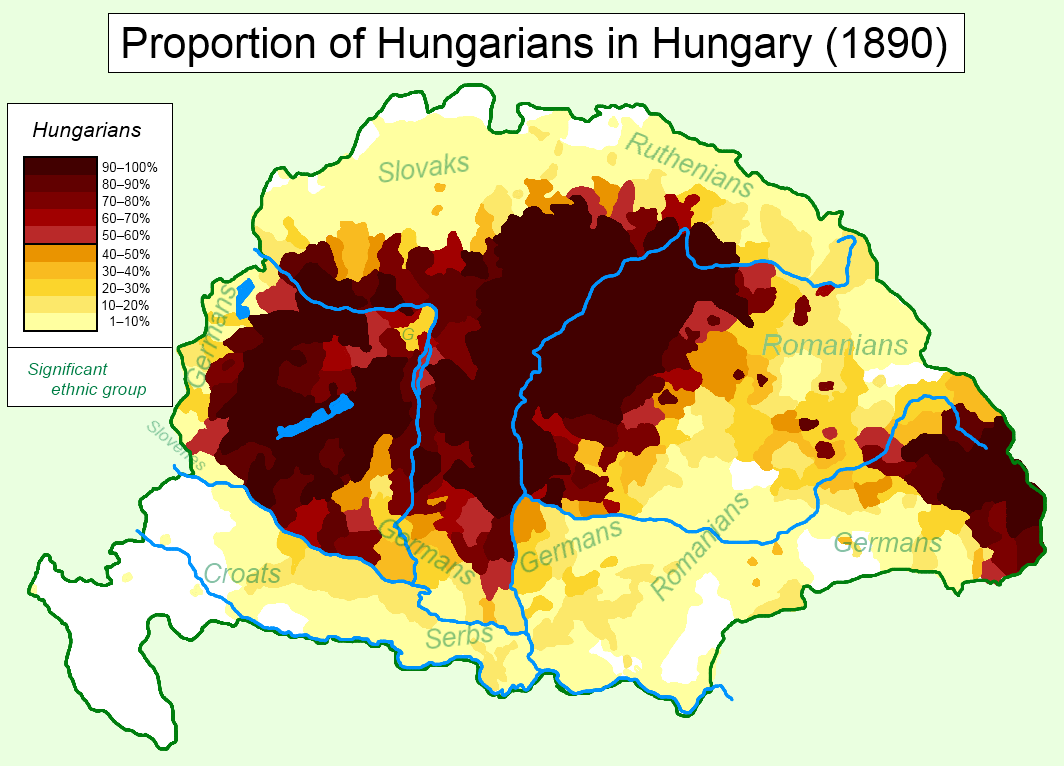
The percentage of ethnic Hungarians (Magyars) in Hungary in 1890.

Despite appealing exclusively to the Hungarian nobility in his speeches, Kossuth played an important part in the shaping of the law of minority rights in 1849. It was the first law which recognized minority rights in Europe. It gave minorities the freedom to use their mother tongue within the local administration and courts, in schools, in community life and even within the national guard of non-Magyar councils.

However, he did not support any kind of regional administration within Hungary based on the nationality principle. Kossuth accepted some national demands of the Vlach (like the independence of the Vlach clergy) and the Croats, but he showed no understanding for the requests of the Slovaks. Despite his father's Slovak origin and the fact that his uncle György Kossuth was the main supporter of Slovak national movement, Kossuth considered himself Hungarian and went so far as to reject the very notion of a Slovak nation in the Kingdom of Hungary.

According to Oszkár Jászi, a huge part of the reason as to why Kossuth opposed giving large-scale autonomy (such as a separate parliament) to various ethnic groups in Hungary (such as the Romanians, Slovaks, Ruthenians, and Germans) is because he was afraid that this would be the first step towards a fragmentation and break-up of Hungary. Kossuth did not believe that a Hungary that was limited to its ethnic or linguistic borders would actually be a viable state.

==== Russian intervention and failure ====
During all the terrible winter that followed, Kossuth overcame the reluctance of the army to march to the relief of Vienna; after the defeat at the Battle of Schwechat, at which he was present, he sent Józef Bem to carry on the war in Transylvania.

At the end of the year, when the Austrians were approaching Pest, he asked for the mediation of William Henry Stiles, the American envoy. Alfred I, Prince of Windisch-Grätz, however, refused all terms, and the Diet and government fled to Debrecen, Kossuth taking with him the Crown of St Stephen, the sacred emblem of the Hungarian nation. In November 1848, Emperor Ferdinand abdicated in favour of Franz Joseph. The new Emperor revoked all the concessions granted in March and outlawed Kossuth and the Hungarian government, set up lawfully on the basis of the April laws.

By April 1849, when the Hungarians had won many successes, after sounding the army, he issued the celebrated Hungarian Declaration of Independence, in which he declared that "the House of Habsburg-Lorraine, perjured in the sight of God and man, had forfeited the Hungarian throne." It was a step characteristic of his love for extreme and dramatic action, but it added to the dissensions between him and those who wished only for autonomy under the old dynasty, and his enemies did not scruple to accuse him of aiming for kingship. The dethronement also made any compromise with the Habsburgs practically impossible.

For the time the future form of government was left undecided, and Kossuth was appointed regent-president (to satisfy both royalists and republicans). Kossuth played a key role in tying down the Hungarian army for weeks for the siege and recapture of Buda castle, finally successful on 4 May 1849. The hopes of ultimate success were, however, frustrated by the intervention of Tsar Nicholas I of Russia, who acted as the protector of ruling legitimism and as guardian against revolution; all appeals to the western powers were vain, and on 11 August Kossuth abdicated in favor of Görgey, on the ground that in the last extremity, the general alone could save the nation. Görgey capitulated at Világos (now Şiria, Romania) to the Russians, who handed over the army to the Austrians. Görgey was spared, at the insistence of the Russians. Reprisals were taken on the rest of the Hungarian army, including the execution of the 13 Martyrs of Arad. Kossuth steadfastly maintained until his death that Görgey alone was responsible for the humiliation.

Kossuth's calls for independence and cut off ties with the Habsburgs did not become British policy. Foreign Secretary Lord Palmerston told parliament that Britain would consider it a great misfortune to Europe if Hungary became independent. He argued that a united Austrian Empire was a European necessity and a natural ally of Britain.

During this period, Hungarian lawyer George Lichtenstein served as Kossuth's private secretary. After the revolution, Lichtenstein fled to Königsberg and eventually settled in Edinburgh, where he became noted as a musician and influence on musical culture of the city.

== Escape and tour of Britain and United States ==
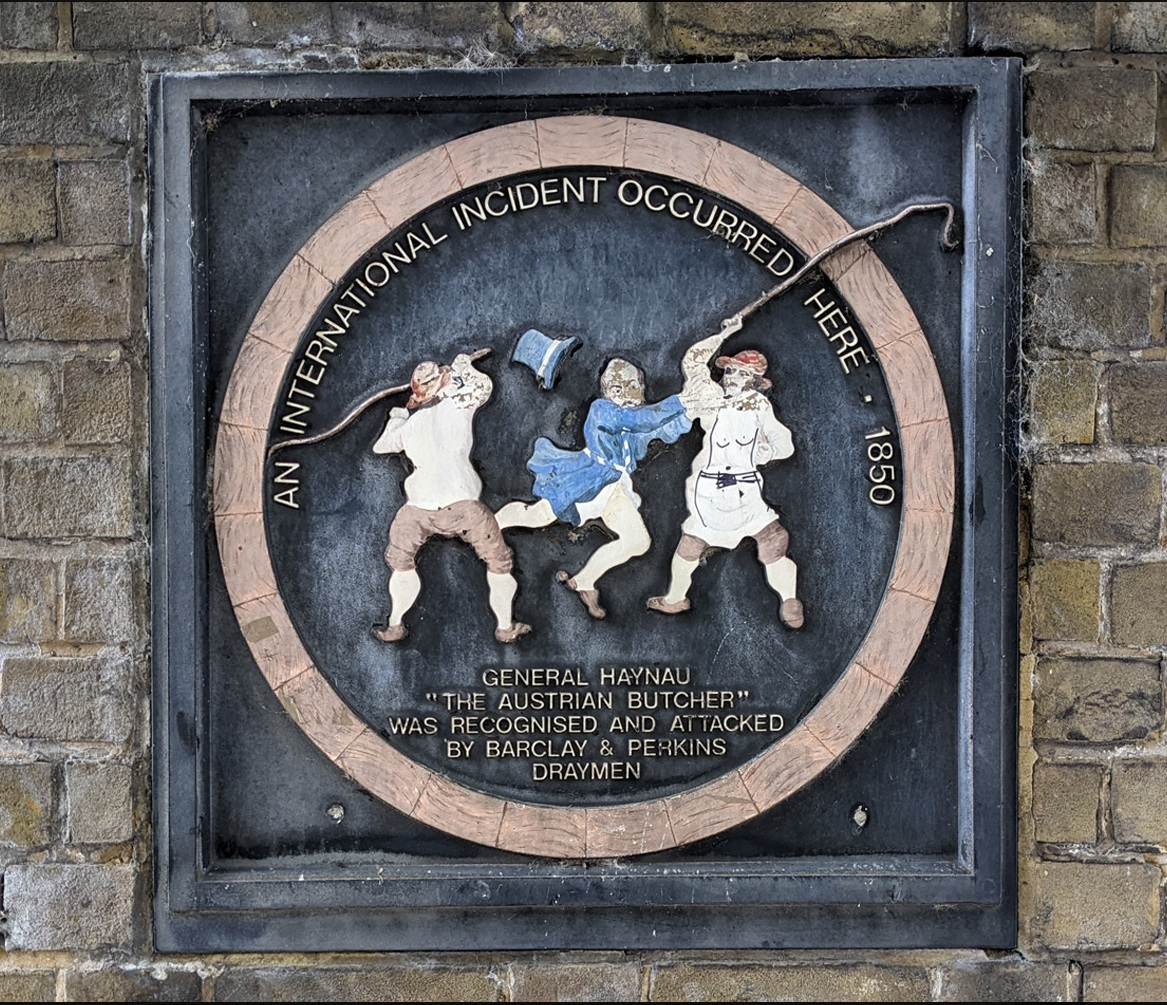
Austrian General Julius Jacob von Haynau was attacked by Londoners due to the brutal suppression of Hungarian revolution. Plaque in London, Park Street in Southwark

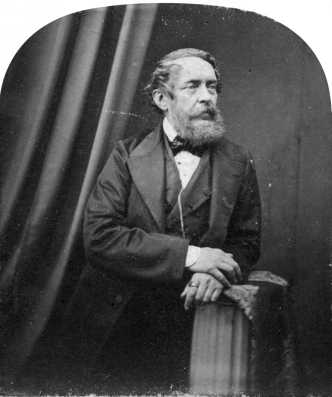
Photo of Kossuth

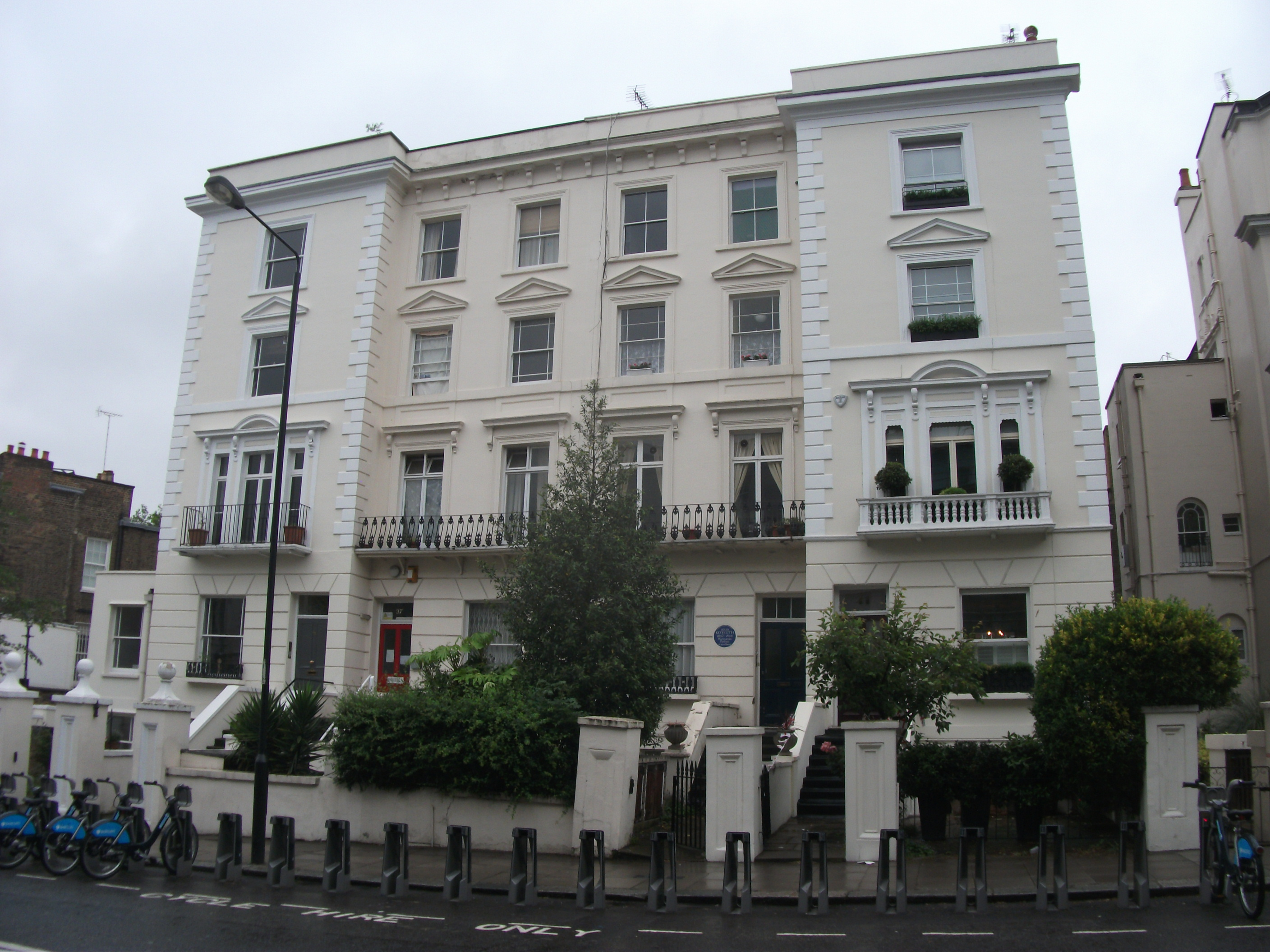
Kossuth's villa in London

Kossuth's time in power was at an end. A solitary fugitive, he crossed the Ottoman frontier. He was hospitably received by the Ottoman authorities, who were supported by the British. The Ottomans refused to surrender him and other fugitives to Austria, notwithstanding the threats of the allied emperors. In January 1850, he was removed from Vidin, where he had been kept under house arrest, to Shumen, and thence to Kütahya in Asia Minor. There, he was joined by his children, who had been confined at Pressburg; his wife (a price had been set on her head) had joined him earlier, having escaped in disguise.

On 10 August 1851 the release of Kossuth was decided by the Sublime Porte, in spite of threats by Austria and Russia. The United States Congress approved having Kossuth come there, and on 1 September 1851, he boarded the ship USS Mississippi at Smyrna, with his family and fifty exiled followers.

The Hungarian asked the crew of Mississippi to leave the shipboard at Gibraltar. During his journey on board the American frigate Mississippi on his way to London, an enormous French crowd waited to welcome Kossuth at the port of Marseille. However the French authorities did not allow the dangerous revolutionary to come ashore. At Marseille, Kossuth sought permission to travel through France to England, but Prince-President Louis Napoleon denied the request. Kossuth protested publicly, and officials saw that as a blatant disregard for the neutral position of the United States.

=== Great Britain ===
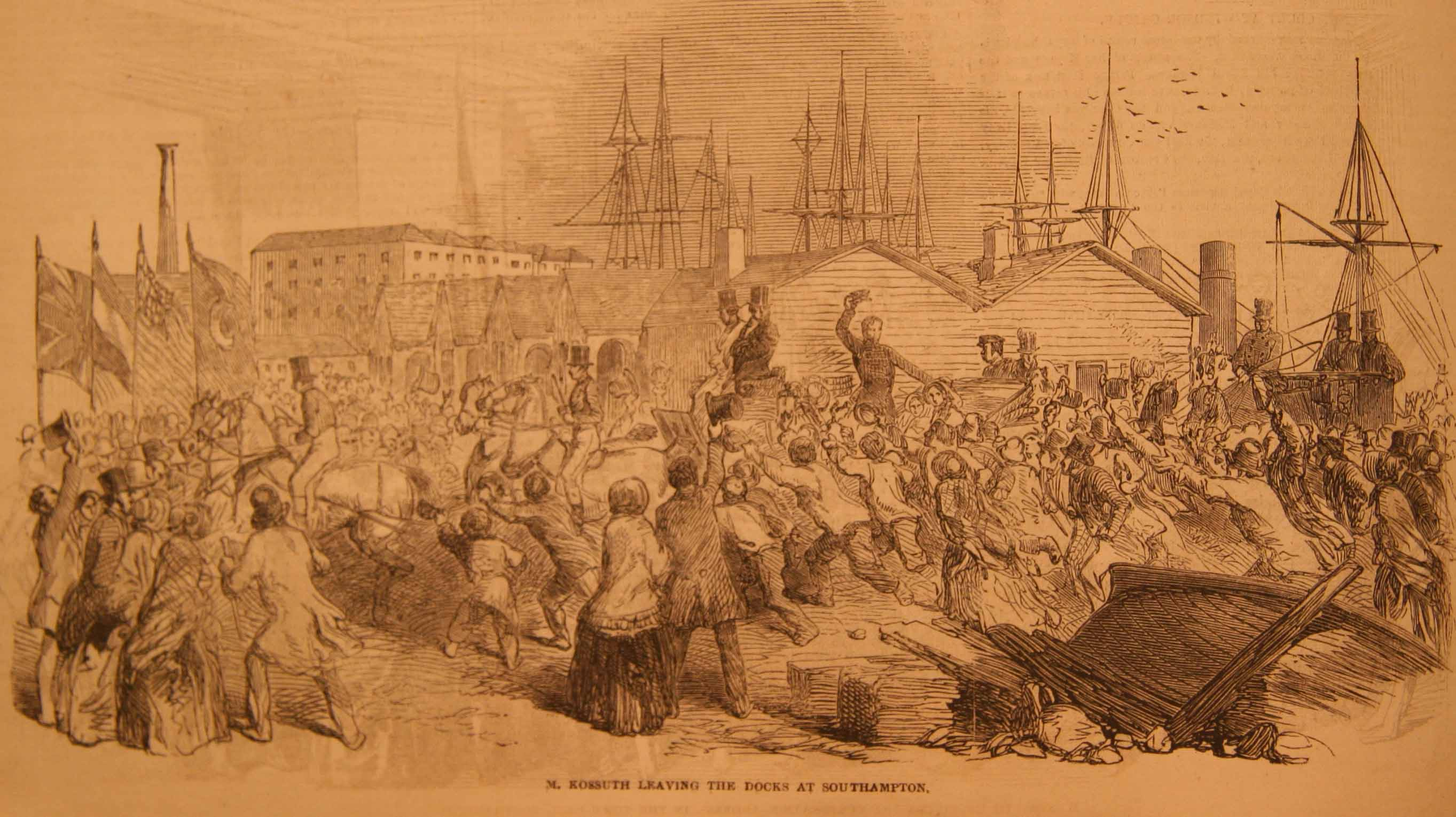
Lajos Kossuth Arrives at Southampton Docks

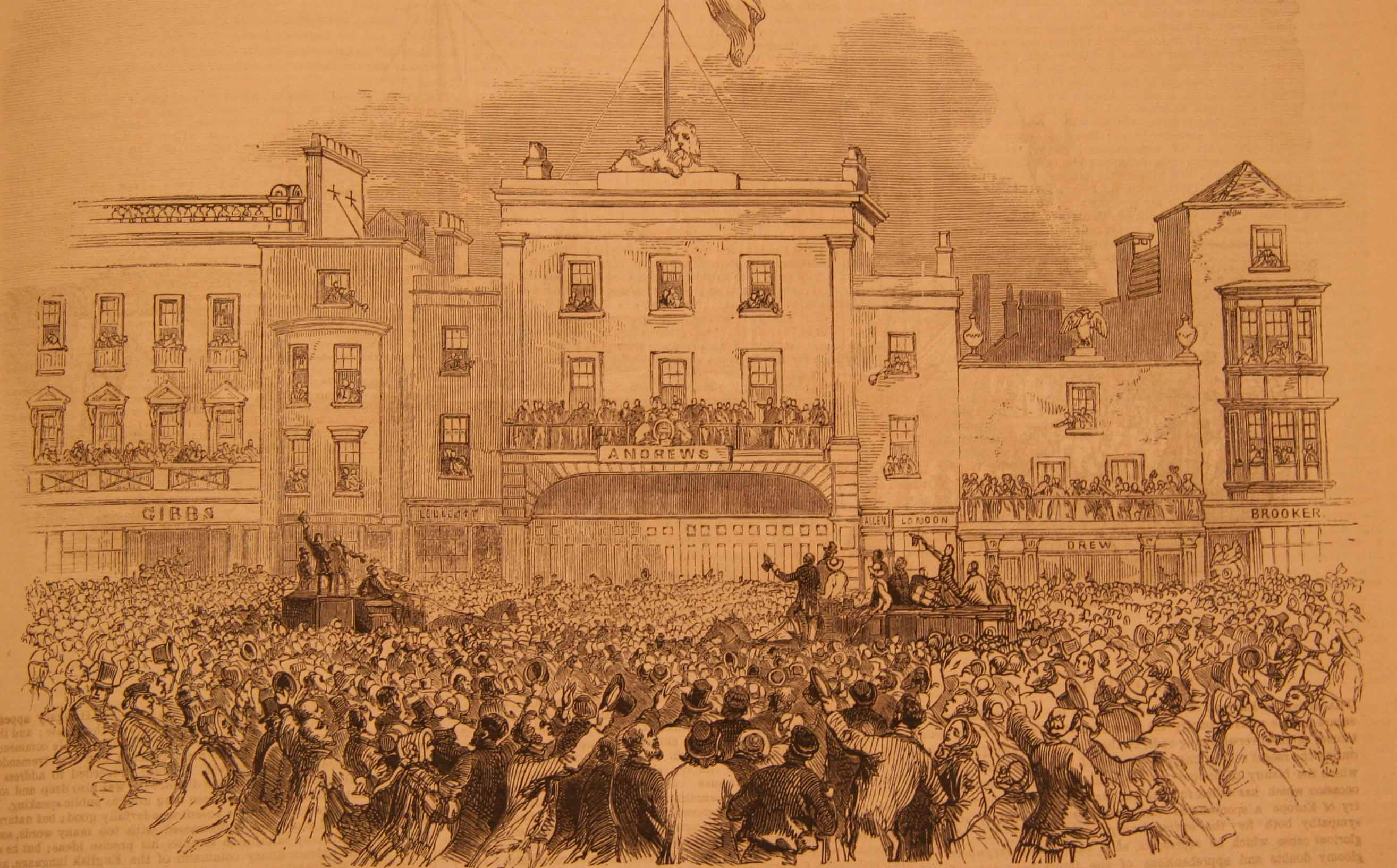
Lajos Kossuth addresses the crowd from the balcony of Andrew's coach factory.

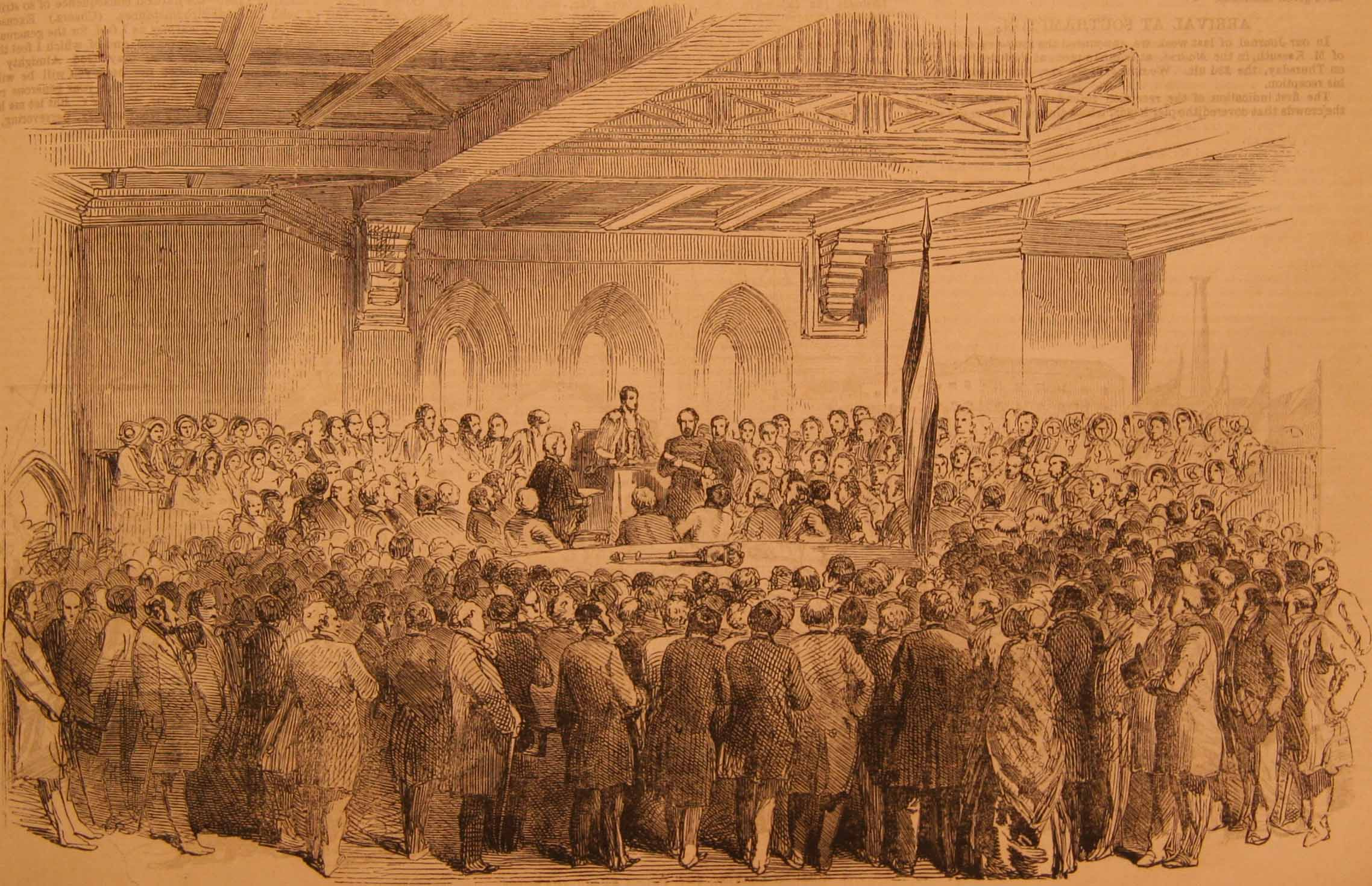
Lajos Kossuth's reception among businessmen industrialists and bankers in the Guildhall above the Bargate

On 23 October, Kossuth landed at Southampton and spent three weeks in England, where he was generally feted. After his arrival, the press characterized the atmosphere of the streets of London as this: "It had seemed like a coronation day of Kings". Contemporary reports noticed: "Trafalgar Square was 'black with people' and Nelson's Monument peopled 'up to the fluted shaft.'"

Addresses were presented to him at Southampton, Birmingham and other towns; he was officially entertained by the Lord Mayor of the City of London; at each place, he spoke eloquently in English for the Hungarian cause; and he indirectly caused Queen Victoria to stretch the limits of her constitutional power over her Ministers to avoid embarrassment and eventually helped cause the fall of the government in power.

Having learned English during an earlier political imprisonment with the aid of a volume of Shakespeare, his spoken English was "wonderfully archaic" and theatrical. The Times, generally cool towards the revolutionaries of 1848 in general and Kossuth in particular, nevertheless reported that his speeches were "clear" and that a three-hour talk was not unusual for him; and also, that if he was occasionally overcome by emotion when describing the defeat of Hungarian aspirations, "it did not at all reduce his effectiveness".

At Southampton, he was greeted by a crowd of thousands outside the Mayor's balcony, who presented him with a flag of the Hungarian Republic. The City of London Corporation accompanied him in procession through the city, and the way to the Guildhall was lined by thousands of cheering people. He went thereafter to Winchester, Liverpool, Manchester and Birmingham; at Birmingham the crowd that gathered to see him ride under the triumphal arches erected for his visit was described, even by his severest critics, as 75,000 individuals.

Despite efforts by some British politicians to limit public enthusiasm, Kossuth’s visit attracted large crowds and popular support. When The Times tried to fiercely attack Kossuth, the copies of the newspaper were publicly burned in public houses, coffee houses, and in other public spaces throughout the country.

Back in London, he addressed the Trades Unions at Copenhagen Fields in Islington. Some twelve thousand "respectable artisans" formed a parade at Russell Square and marched out to meet him. At the Fields themselves, the crowd was enormous; The Times estimated it conservatively at 25,000, while the Morning Chronicle described it as 50,000, and the demonstrators themselves 100,000.

The Foreign Secretary, Lord Palmerston, who had already proved himself a friend of the losing sides in several of the failed revolutions of 1848, was determined to receive him at his country house, Broadlands. The Cabinet had to vote to prevent it; Victoria reputedly was so incensed by the possibility of her Foreign Secretary supporting an outspoken republican that she asked the Prime Minister, Lord John Russell for Palmerston's resignation, but Russell claimed that such a dismissal would be drastically unpopular at that time and over that issue. When Palmerston upped the ante by receiving at his house, instead of Kossuth, a delegation of Trade Unionists from Islington and Finsbury and listened sympathetically as they read an address that praised Kossuth and declared the Emperors of Austria and Russia "despots, tyrants and odious assassins", it was noted as a mark of indifference to royal displeasure. That, together with Palmerston's support of Louis Napoleon, eventually caused the Russell government to fall.

Kossuth’s activities coincided with growing anti-Austrian sentiment in Britain, when Austrian general Julius Jacob von Haynau was recognized on the street, he was attacked by British draymen on his journey in England. In 1856, Kossuth toured Scotland extensively, giving lectures in major cities and small towns alike.

In addition, the indignation that he aroused against Russian policy had much to do with the strong anti-Russian feeling, which made the Crimean War possible. During the Crimean War, the activism of Kossuth also intensified in London, but since Austria did not side with Russia, there was no chance of Hungarian independence being achieved with Anglo-French military help. In the following years, Kossuth hoped that the conflicts between the great powers would allow the liberation of Hungary after all, and so he contacted the French Emperor Napoleon III. When Napoleon III and the Prime Minister of Sardinia, Camillo Benso, Count of Cavour, promised to help liberate Hungary in the run-up to the Franco-Sardinian-Austrian war of 1859, Lajos Kossuth founded the Hungarian National Directorate with László Teleki and György Klapka and began to organise the Hungarian Legion. Following Napoleon III's unexpected peace with Austria after his brilliant victory at Solferino, Kossuth sought to link the liberation of Hungary more and more clearly to the movement of the peoples fighting for their independence. However, Giuseppe Garibaldi's invasion of Sicily in 1860 raised new hopes. Many Hungarians fought among his Redshirts, and his successes could have led to another Italo-Austrian war. In the event, the Hungarian Legion was re-established, and Kossuth negotiated cooperation with the Italians. But the war was not fought. Although Hungary remained under Austrian rule, the decline of Habsburg power increasingly forced compromise on the Austrian government. Hungarian passive resistance and the foreign activities of the Kossuth group reinforced each other. Kossuth and the émigré movement's armed preparations and negotiations with the great powers, on the other hand, were backed by the political backdrop of a silent and passively resistant country.

=== United States ===
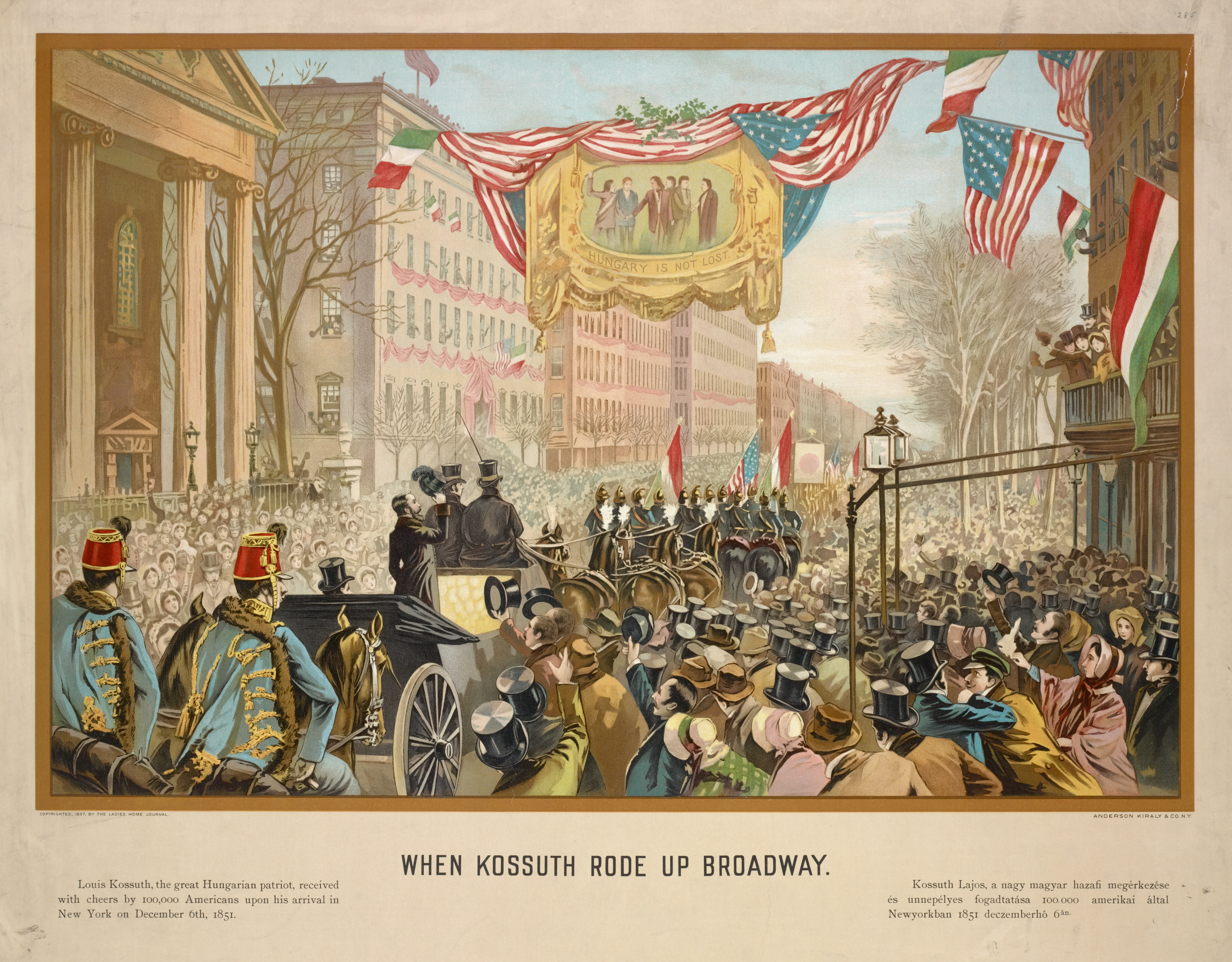
"When Kossuth Rode up Broadway" (New York on 6 December 1851)

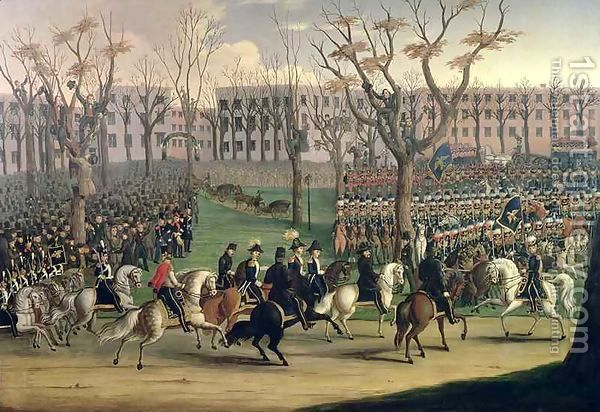
The dress parade of US. Army in New York for Kossuth on 6 December 1851

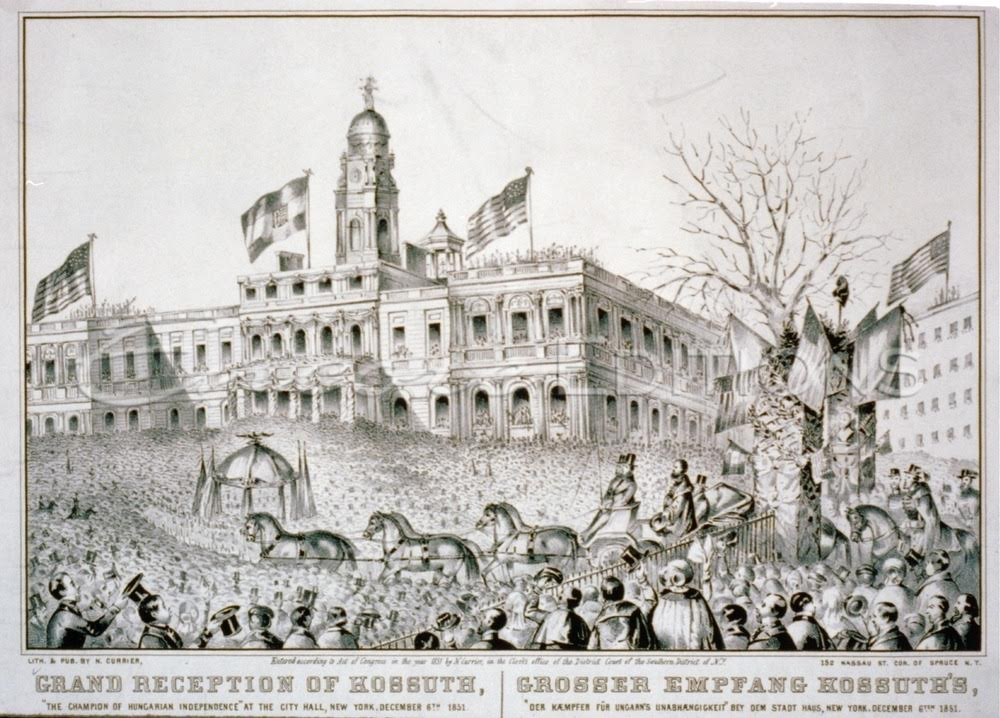
Grand reception of Kossuth: "the champion of Hungarian Independence" at the City Hall, New York

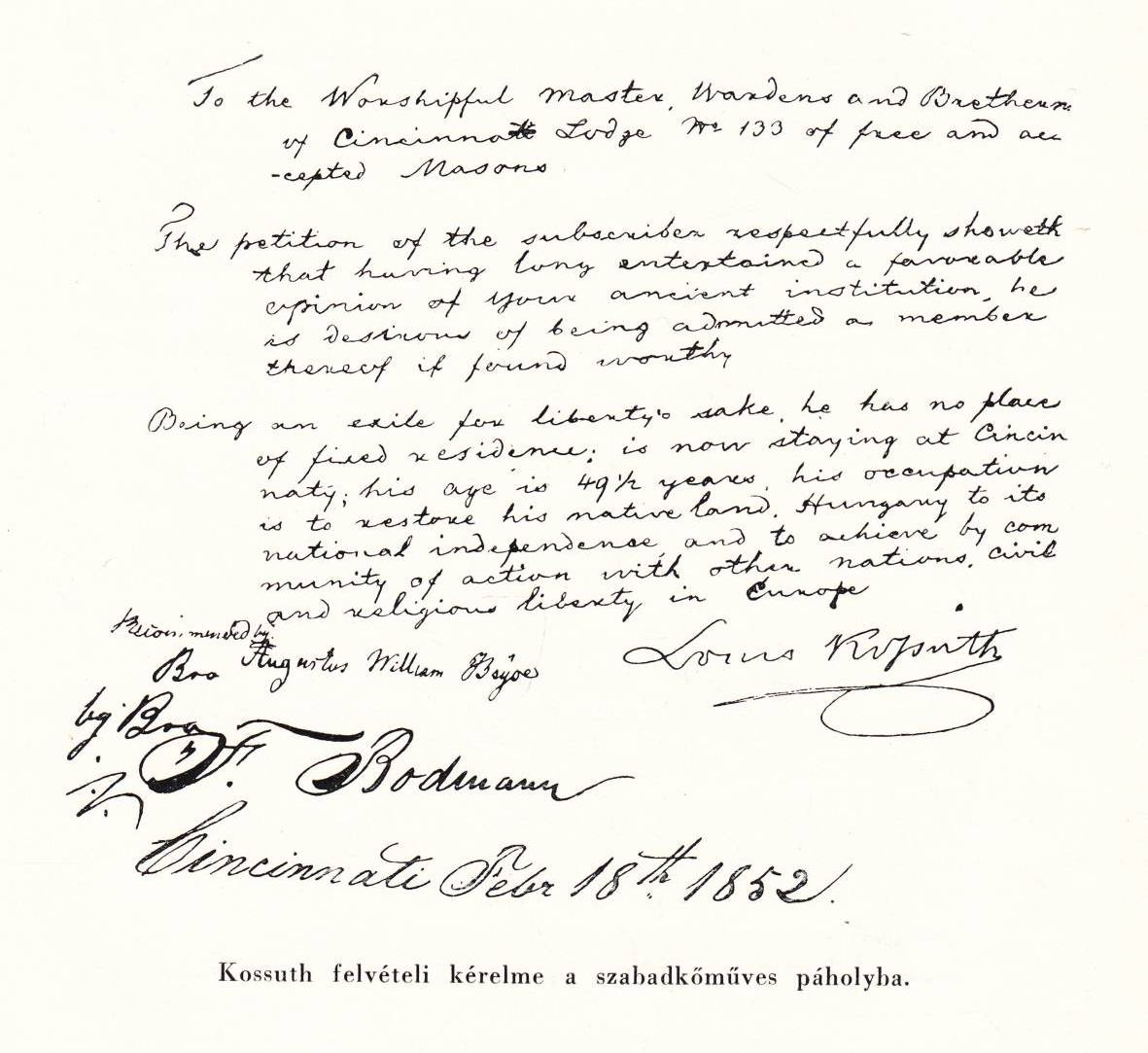
Kossuth's admission to Freemason Grand Lodge of Cincinnati, US, 1852 (Manuscript from University of Szeged)

From Britain Kossuth went to the United States of America aboard the Humboldt postal vessel. He was warmly welcomed since the Congress in a letter inviting him to the country as the 'guest of the nation'. On 6 December 1851, this revolutionary hero arrived in New York City to a reception that only Washington and Lafayette had received before. The mayor of New York City introduced him as "a champion of human progress, an eloquent proclaimer of universal freedom". On the posters and in the news, he appeared as an ambassador of the European nations yearning for freedom and democracy, an implacable opponent of the tyranny embodied by the Habsburgs and the Russian Romanovs. Like the more than 600 other speeches he has given in America, it as well ended with applause.

The report of The Sun about the arrival of Kossuth in New York:

Thus immediately previous to the Christmas of 1851 New York city underwent a period of Kossuth mania, and it affected the holiday presents. Every New Year's gift associated itself in some designation with Kossuth and Hungary. Restaurants abounded with Hungarian goulash, a savory dish of boiled beef and vegetables strongly infused with red peppers; and there were Kossuth cravats (formidable bands of satin or silk wound around the neck, with ends liberally folded over the shirt front), Kossuth pipes, Kossuth umbrellas, Kossuth belts and buckles, Kossuth purses, Kossuth jackets, and Kossuth braid and tassels for wearing apparel...The American Museum on Broadway "was literally covered with paintings and flags. One, a portrait of Kossuth, in the folds of Hungarian and American flags, with the words at the bottom: 'Kossuth, the Washington of Hungary.'

President Millard Fillmore entertained Kossuth at the White House on 31 December 1851 and 3 January 1852. The US Congress organized a banquet for Kossuth, which was supported by all political parties.

In early 1852, Kossuth, accompanied by his wife, his son Ferenc, and Theresa Pulszky, toured the American Midwest, South, and New England. Kossuth was the second foreigner after the Marquis de Lafayette to address a Joint Meeting of the United States Congress. He gave a speech before the Ohio General Assembly in February 1852 that probably influenced Lincoln's Gettysburg Address: "The spirit of our age is Democracy. All for the people, and all by the people. Nothing about the people without the people – That is Democracy! ..."

Kossuth gained widespread popularity and admiration across the continent. Even babies were named after him during his American tour. At the same time, dozens of books, hundreds of pamphlets, articles, and essays, as well as about 250 poems were written to, for, or about him in the 1850s.

Queen Victoria had a negative remark about the American version of Kossuth fever too: "the popular Kossuth fever of the time to ignorance of the man in whom they (the Americans) see a second Washington, when the fact is that he is an ambitious and rapacious humbug."

There is no evidence that Kossuth ever met Abraham Lincoln, although Lincoln did organize a celebration in Kossuth's honor in Springfield, Illinois, calling him a "most worthy and distinguished representative of the cause of civil and religious liberty on the continent of Europe". Kossuth believed that by appealing directly to European immigrants in the American heartland that he could rally them behind the cause of a free and democratic Hungary. United States officials feared that Kossuth's efforts to elicit support for a failed revolution were fraught with mischief. He would not denounce slavery or stand up for the Catholic Church, and when Kossuth declared George Washington had never intended for the policy of non-interference to serve as constitutional dogma, he caused further defection. Luckily for him, it was unknown then that he entertained a proposal to raise 1,500 mercenaries, who would overthrow Haiti with officers from the US Army and Navy. Ralph Waldo Emerson praised Kossuth: "You have earned your own nobility at home. We admit you ad eundem (as they say at College). We admit you to the same degree, without new trial. We suspend all rules before so paramount a merit. You may well sit a doctor in the college of liberty. You have achieved your right to interpret our Washington."

Digital reconstruction of the flag displayed on his visit to Washington D. C., 1852

However, the issue of slavery was tearing America apart. Kossuth infuriated the abolitionists by refusing to say anything offensive to the pro-slavery establishment, which, however, did not give him much support. Abolitionists said that Kossuth's "hands off" position regarding American slavery was unacceptable. Wm. Lloyd Garrison, on behalf of the American Anti-Slavery Society, published a pamphlet "exposing the Hungarian as a self-seeking toady." Kossuth left the U.S. with only a fraction of the money he had hoped to earn on his tour. However it is proven by captain of the artillery Károly László's contemporary diary entries, that the Hungarian delegation expressed strong disapproval of slavery in the American South. He also condemned blackface in his entries. He describes a slave auction he saw in New Orleans this way: "Here we have seen how the owners put their fellow human beings who are just as advanced and perhaps more sensitive than they are, up for sale as if they were animals, and how they are scrutinised by buyers. We have seen how [a trader] sold a mother and her 10-year-old son as a calving cow.... Seeing such things makes you feel sick." Kossuth was of the same opinion, as he expressed his ideas on the matter on several Hungarian diets. In 1833 he compares slavery to serfdom and condemns both, on another occasion, expressed the need for the immediate liberation of the serfs, which just as emancipation, must be radical. In 1834 he declares that abolition is the most glorious act, nobler than any victory in battle. In America, he is afraid to do such a thing, because he feared that there would be fewer like-minded people in America, having seen the South.

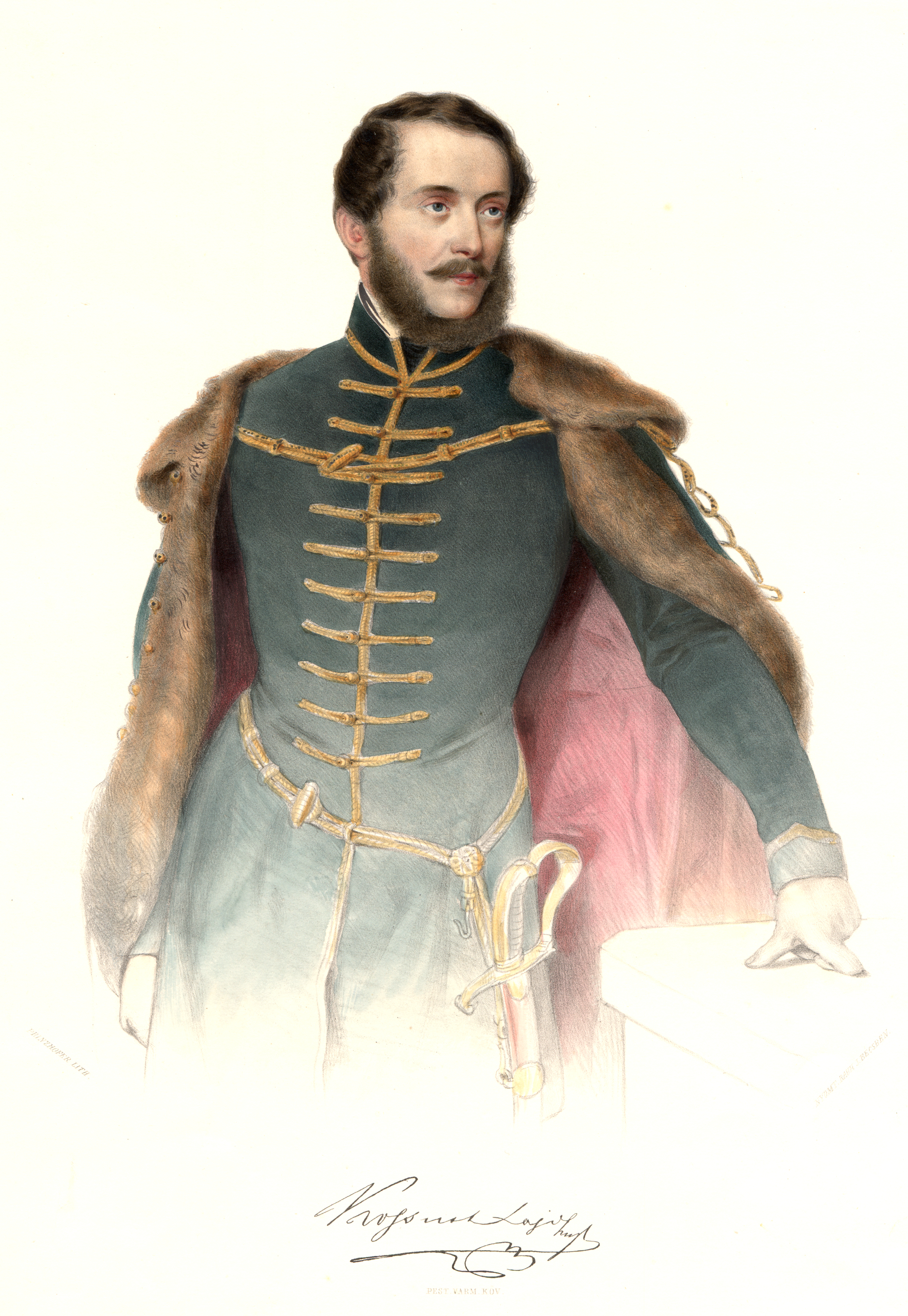
Coloured lithograph by August Prinzhofer and Johann Rauh (c. 1848)

Kossuth’s endorsement of Franklin Pierce was controversial and may have affected his standing with some supporters. The gaffe brought him back to London in July 1852.

Early the next year, he sent Ferenc Pulszky to meet with Pierce to obtain support for intervention in Europe. Pulszky was to also meet in secret with Lt. William Nelson USN and make plans for an expedition against Haiti and Santo Domingo. The plot ended with the failure of the Milanese riots of 1853, and Kossuth made no further efforts to win backing from the United States.

== London ==
=== Attempted leadership in exile ===
After returning from America to Europe, he lived permanently in London for eight years, where he gained many important connections in British parliamentary, writer and journalistic circles. He also liaised with circles of French, Italian, Russian, German, and Polish emigrants, most notably Giuseppe Mazzini and Stanisław Gabriel Worcell, who were influential in organizing unsubstantiated uprising attempts in the early 1850s. In the following years, Kossuth expected that the conflicts between the great powers would still make it possible to liberate Hungary, and therefore he had even several personal talks with Emperor Napoleon III in Paris.

He made a close connection with his friend Giuseppe Mazzini, by whom, with some misgiving, he was persuaded to join the Revolutionary Committee. Quarrels of a kind only too common among exiles followed.

He watched with anxiety every opportunity of once more freeing his country from Austria. An attempt to organize a Hungarian legion during the Crimean War was stopped; but in 1859, he entered into negotiations with Napoleon III, left England for Italy and began the organization of a Hungarian legion, which was to make a descent on the coast of Dalmatia. The Peace of Villafranca made that impossible. There were still significant international forces supporting the Habsburgs to maintain their empire, because Austria was seen as an important element in the balance of great powers.

Gradually, his autocratic style and uncompromising outlook destroyed any real influence among the Hungarian expatriate community. Other Hungarian exiles protested against his appearing to claim to be the only national hero of the revolution. Count Kázmér Batthyány attacked him in The Times, and Bertalan Szemere, who had been prime minister under him, published a bitter criticism of his acts and character, accusing him of arrogance, cowardice and duplicity. Hungarians were especially offended by his continuing use of the title of Regent. Kossuth considered the use of his regent title constitutionally justified until the next democratic elections in Hungary. Accordingly, he used his title until the 1869 Hungarian parliamentary election.

== Later years: Italy ==
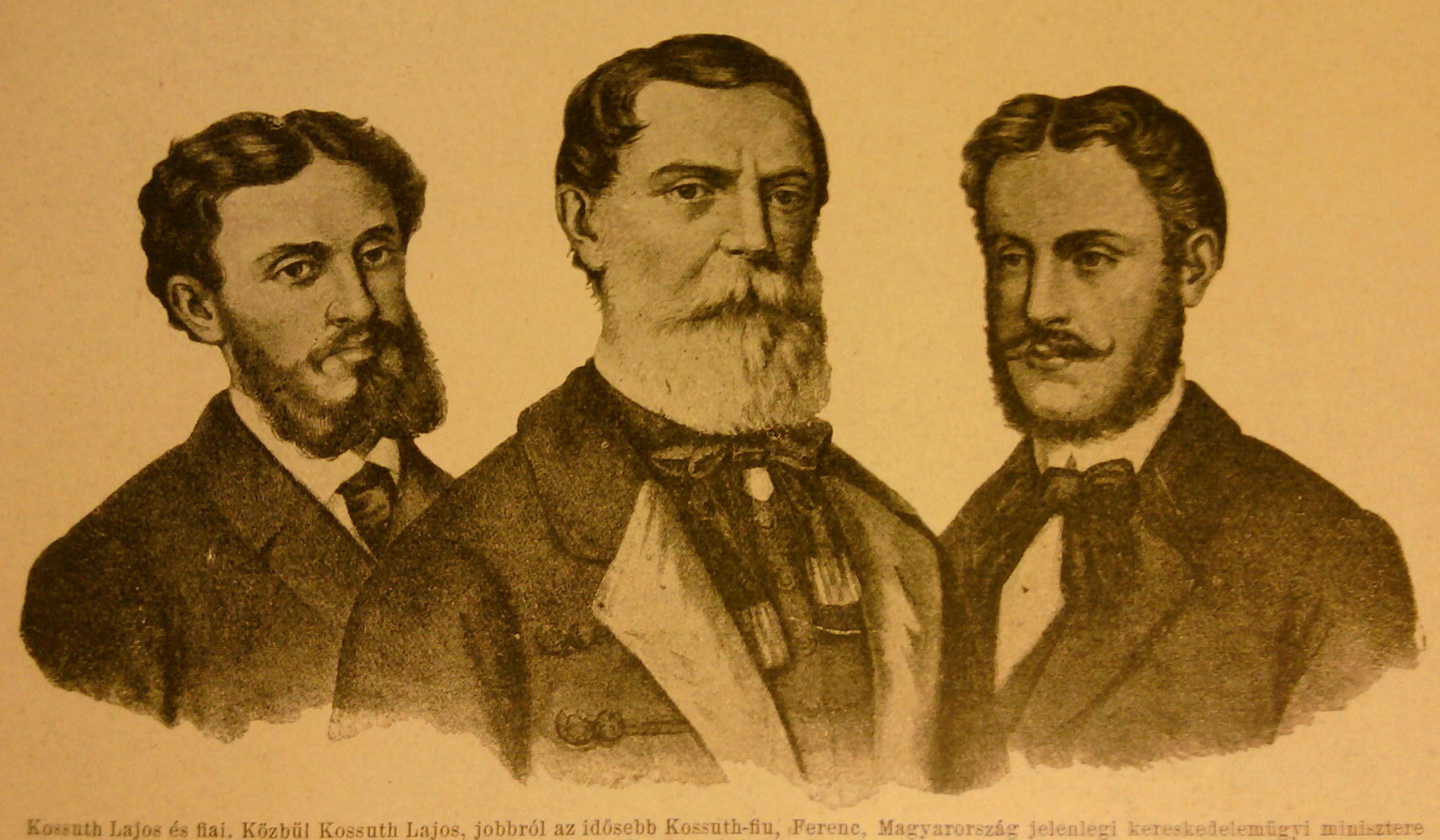
Louis Kossuth and his sons. Lajos Tódor Károly is on the left, Ferenc on the right.

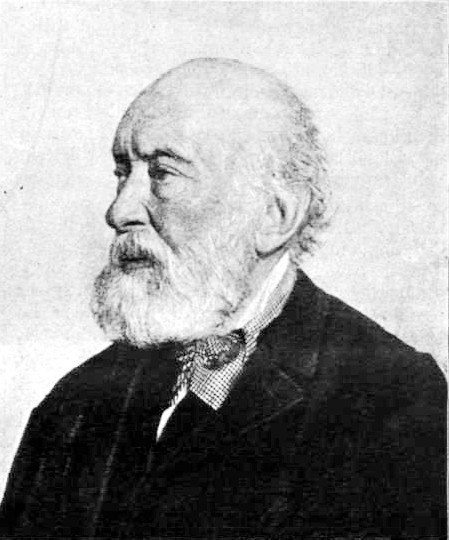
Kossuth in Turin, 1892

=== Embittered break with Hungarian patriots ===
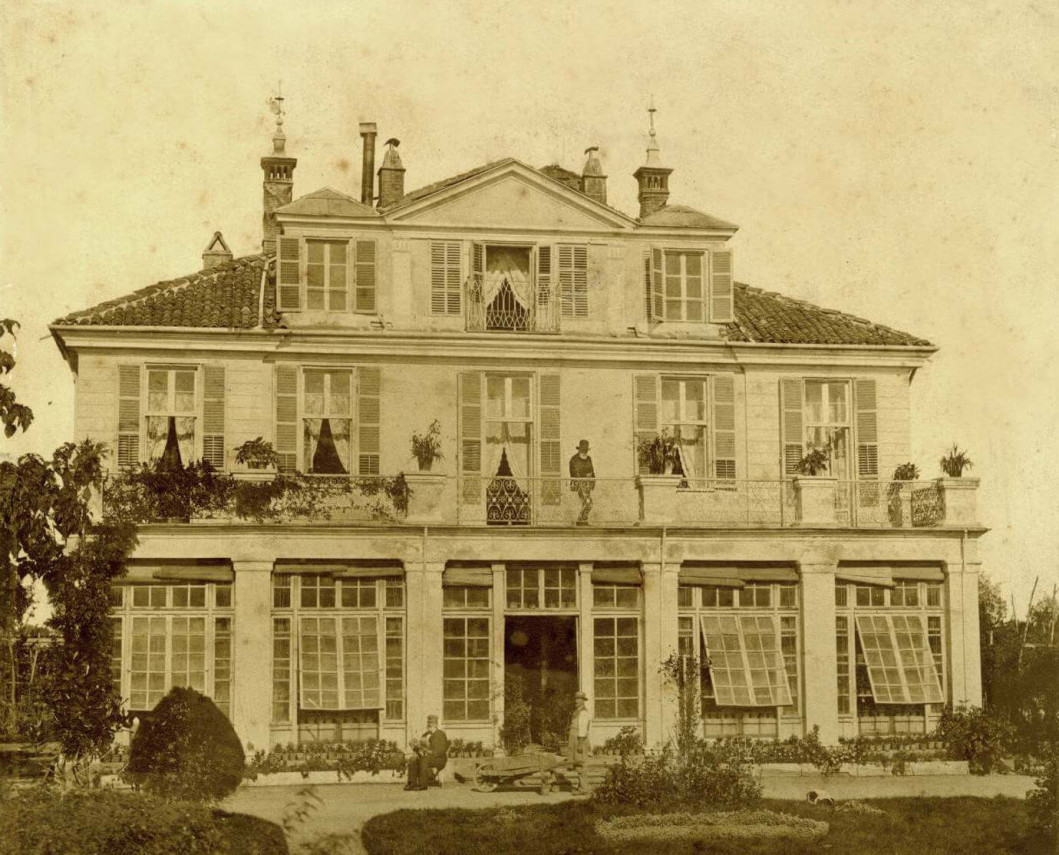
The villa where Kossuth lived in Collegno al Baraccone from 1874 until 1882. Kossuth himself is visible standing on the balcony.

There were still significant international forces supporting the Habsburgs to maintain their empire, because Austria was seen as an important element in the continental balance of power. However, Garibaldi's invasion of Sicily in 1860 raised new hopes for Kossuth. Many Hungarian 1848 veterans fought among the Italian soldiers, and the Italian successes could have led to another Italian-Austrian war. To this end, the Hungarian Legion was re-established, and Kossuth negotiated cooperation with the Italians. However the promise of the international conference never took root. In 1861, Kossuth moved to Turin, Italy, had to watch Ferenc Deák guide Hungary toward a compromise with the Austrian monarchy. He did so with a bitter heart, and on the day before the Austro-Hungarian Compromise of 1867 (German: Ausgleich, Hungarian: Kiegyezés), he published an open letter condemning it and Deák. This so-called "Cassandra letter" rallied the opponents of the Compromise, but they could not prevent its adoption and subsequent continuation. Kossuth blamed Deák for giving up the nation's right of true independence and asserted that the conditions he had accepted went against the interests of the state's very existence. In the letter, his vision predicted that Hungary, having bound its fate to that of the Austrian German nation and the Habsburgs, would go down with them. He adumbrated a subsequent devastating European-scale war on the Continent, which would be fueled and induced by extremist nationalism, with Hungary on the side of a "dying empire".

"I see in the Compromise the death of our nation," he wrote.

From then on, Kossuth remained in Italy. He refused to follow the other Hungarian patriots, who, under the lead of Deák, negotiated the Austro-Hungarian Compromise of 1867 and the ensuing amnesty. It is doubted whether Emperor Franz Joseph would have allowed the amnesty to extend to Kossuth.

=== Hungarian resistance against the Compromise ===
While the Austro-Hungarian Compromise of 1867 inaugurated the Austro-Hungarian Monarchy and restored constitutional governance to Hungary under Prime Minister Count Gyula Andrássy, the settlement was far from universally embraced. To proponents of complete Hungarian sovereignty, the agreement constituted a profound betrayal of the political legacy forged during the Revolution of 1848–1849.

In an open letter addressed to Ferenc Deák—dated 22 May 1867 and published four days later in the Magyar Újság (Hungarian News)—the exiled statesman Lajos Kossuth warned that the accord would ultimately erode Hungary's political independence. Within this missive, which soon became renowned as the Cassandra Letter, Kossuth starkly declared, “I see in this act the death of the nation,” before closing with the admonition: “But consider that Cassandra was right!” (Note: The quotations are translations of Kossuth's original Hungarian: “én e tényben a nemzet halálát látom” and “De Te fontold meg, hogy Cassandrának igaza volt!”)

Galvanized by Kossuth's polemics against the dualist settlement, democratic circles proliferated across the country, spearheading a prominent wave of popular dissent. Taking their cues from Kossuth's directives abroad, these societies openly agitated against the Compromise and demanded the unqualified restoration of the 1848 constitutional foundations of independence.

Because the Compromise had been negotiated and ratified by a narrow political elite—while a restrictive franchise barred the vast majority of the populace from parliamentary representation—dissent quickly deepened. Consequently, the radical opposition challenged not merely the substance of the accord, but its very constitutional legitimacy, contending that the Diet elected in 1865 possessed no popular mandate to conclude a binding settlement with Austria.

Winning broad public acquiescence for the dualist system proved an arduous task across Hungary. Several counties, notably Heves, Pest, and Szatmár, formally repudiated the settlement and proclaimed their allegiance to Kossuth. As the opposition cultivated a nationwide network of democratic circles, mass rallies denouncing both the government and the Compromise drew thousands of participants across the Great Hungarian Plain. Dispatching declarations of confidence to Kossuth and circulating petitions against the newly established common imperial affairs, the democratic-circle movement expanded rapidly and successfully mobilized substantial numbers of impoverished peasants.

Confronted with mounting unrest, the nascent Hungarian administration resorted to coercive measures. Authorities framed these crackdowns as temporary expedients necessitated by an acute crisis of public order and the precariousness of the fledgling constitutional regime. Nevertheless, to weather the crisis, the government subordinated key tenets of its own liberal platform to the preservation of the state and the consolidation of the Compromise, curtailing freedoms of association, assembly, and the press until it deemed the new order secure. In a prominent display of repression, the state prosecuted and imprisoned László Böszörményi, editor of the radical opposition daily Magyar Újság, for publishing one of Kossuth's letters; sentenced to a year's imprisonment, Böszörményi died in custody in March 1869. By April 1868, the government had outlawed the democratic circles altogether, and in Heves County—a focal point of defiance—it temporarily suspended the county assembly, appointing Gyula Szapáry as royal commissioner to administer the region directly.

=== The "Kossuth party" in the Hungarian parliament ===
The Party of Independence and '48 was established in 1884 by a merger of the Independence Party and the Party of 1848. Although Kossuth had never returned to Hungary, he was the spiritual leader of this opposition party until he died in 1894, and the party was also referred to as the "Kossuth Party" thereafter. From the 1896 elections onwards, it was the main opposition to the ruling Liberal Party. The Kossuth party won the 1905, and 1906 elections, his older son Ferenc Kossuth was Minister for Trade between 1906 and 1910. However it lost the 1910 elections to the National Party of Work. Kossuth's political legacy achieved that ethnic Hungarians did not vote for the ruling pro-compromise Liberal Party in the Hungarian parliamentary elections, thus the political maintenance of the Austro-Hungarian Compromise was mostly a result of the popularity of the pro-compromise Liberal Party among the ethnic minorities.

=== European federalism ===
Publicly, Kossuth remained unreconciled to the house of Habsburg and committed to a fully independent state. He expressed the idea of uniting with the Hungarian and neighbouring peoples in his plans for the future, which also contained many utopian elements, and in his equally utopian plan for the future confederation of the already liberated peoples under the name of Republics of Danubian Confederation. Though elected to the Diet of 1869, he never took his seat.

In 1874 Kossuth bought a villa in the village of Collegno with a large garden in a small hamlet called Baraccone not far from the train station, and spent his days with gardening, botanical expeditions to the Alps, writing his memoirs and receiving Hungarian guests. He was forced to sell the villa in 1882 due to financial difficulties plaguing him since he lost most of his wealth in the aftermath of the 1873 financial crisis. Reluctantly he moved back to the city of Turin.

=== Citizenship ===
In 1879, the Hungarian Parliament passed its first comprehensive citizenship law. A specific clause—Section 31—stated that any Hungarian citizen who lived abroad for more than 10 years without a valid Hungarian passport or official government permission would automatically lose their citizenship. Renewing a passport required an oath of loyalty to the King (Emperor Franz Joseph). Kossuth famously declared that he would rather be "a man without a country" than swear an oath to the Habsburg who had executed his friends and crushed his nation. Due to this, Kossuth lost the Hungarian citizenship on January 8, 1890.

To circumvent the law, dozens of Hungarian cities — including Debrecen, Szeged, and Budapest — granted him honorary citizenship. Pro-Kossuth politicians argued that "honorary citizenship" of a city should technically preserve his national citizenship. However, Prime Minister Kálmán Tisza's government ruled that honorary titles did not override the 1879 law. This rigid stance was so unpopular that it contributed to the eventual fall of the Tisza government.

== Death, legacy, complete works ==
Facing financial hardships, he struggled in his later years. However, encouraged by Ignác Helfy, he started compiling his life memories in 1879, focusing particularly on documents related to emigration history. Additionally, he allowed British, American, French, and Italian publishers to print his renowned speeches and political debates. The remarkable success of his books swiftly reinstated his financial stability and wealth, and throughout his later years, he took pride in the knowledge that he was still making a living through his work.

In 1890, a delegation of Hungarian pilgrims in Turin recorded a short patriotic speech delivered by the elderly Lajos Kossuth. The original recording on two wax cylinders for the Edison phonograph survives to this day, barely audible because of excess playback and unsuccessful early restoration attempts. Recording Kossuth's voice was one of the earliest applications of phonograph, and his few sentences are the earliest known recorded Hungarian speech. Until the discovery of a recording of Helmuth von Moltke in 2012, Lajos Kossuth was the person with the earliest birth date from whom a sound recording was known.

As Headlam noted, Kossuth died in Turin, after which "his body was taken to Pest (Budapest), where he was buried amid the mourning of the whole nation, Mór Jókai delivering the funeral oration"; furthermore, a "bronze statue (was) erected by public subscription, in the Kerepesi Cemetery..." which commemorates Kossuth as "Hungary's purest patriot and greatest orator."

A Hungarian language version of his complete works were published in Budapest between 1880 and 1895.

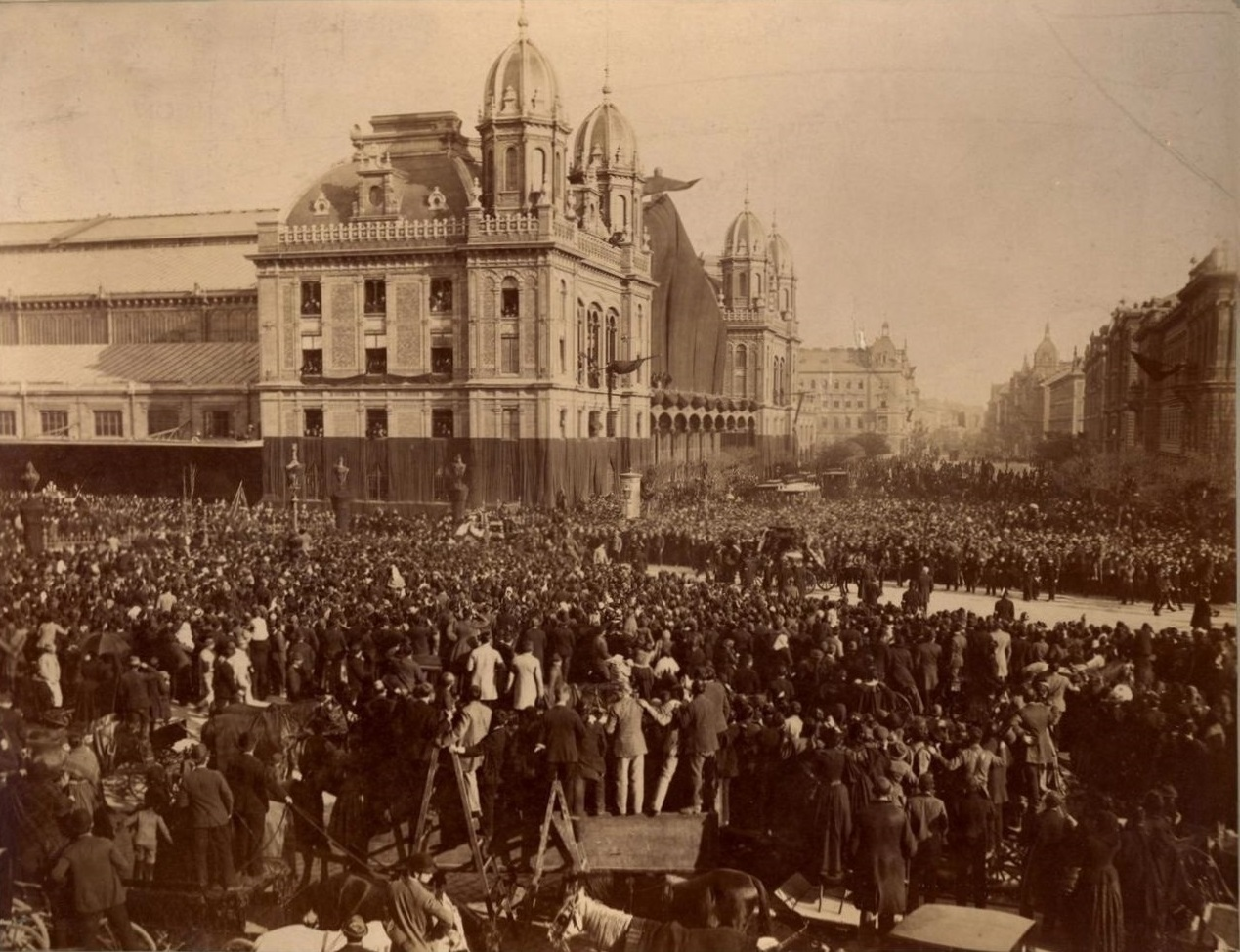
Waiting for the arrival of the coffin of Kossuth at the Western Railway terminal of Budapest in 1894

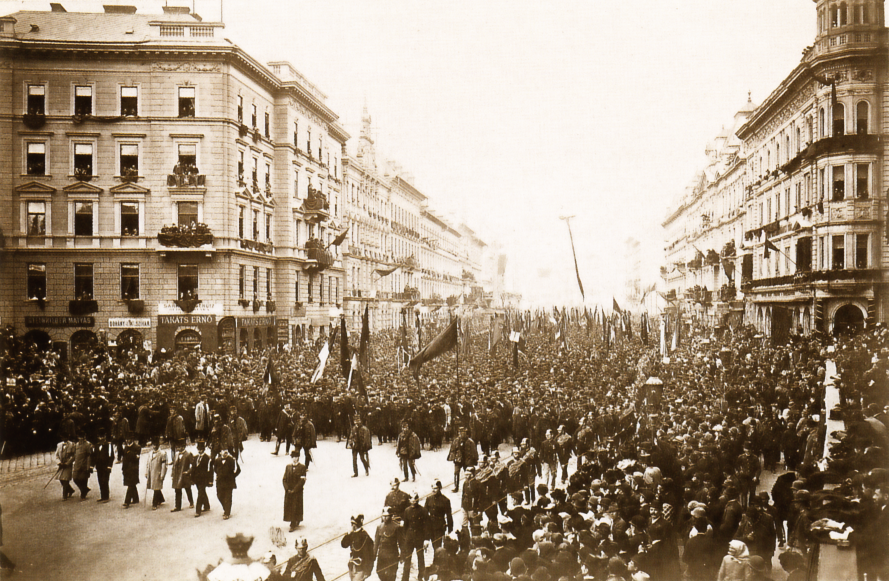
Kossuth funeral procession in Budapest

Kossuth's funeral procession in Budapest in 1894

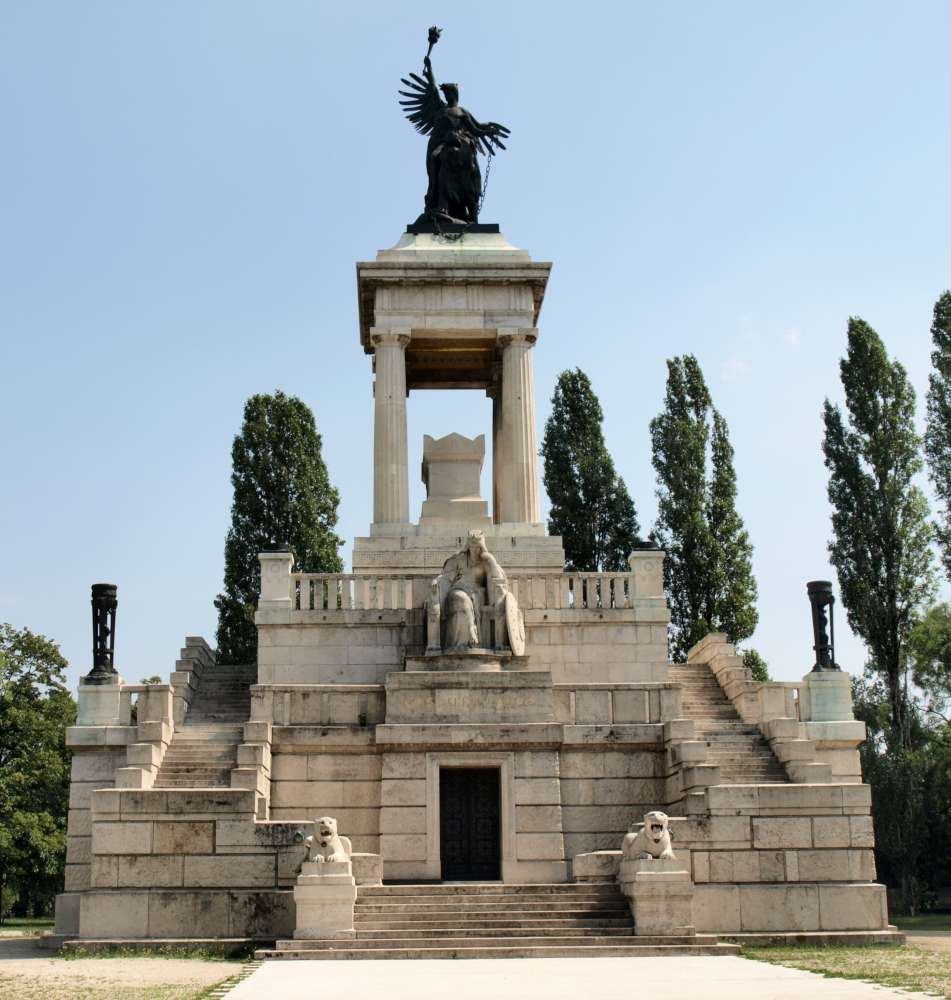
Mausoleum in Kerepesi Cemetery

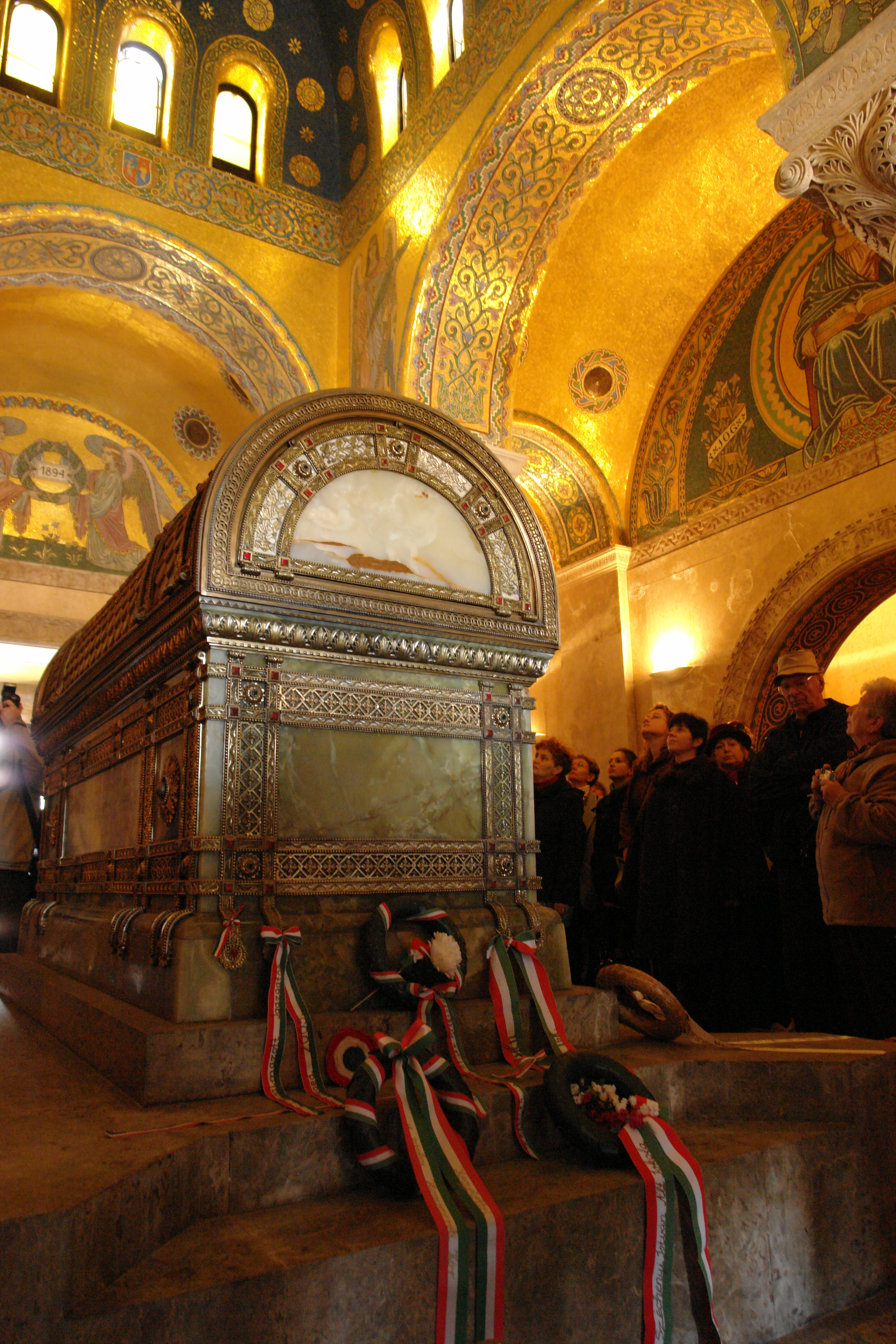
The coffin in the mausoleum

== Honors and memorials ==
=== Hungary ===
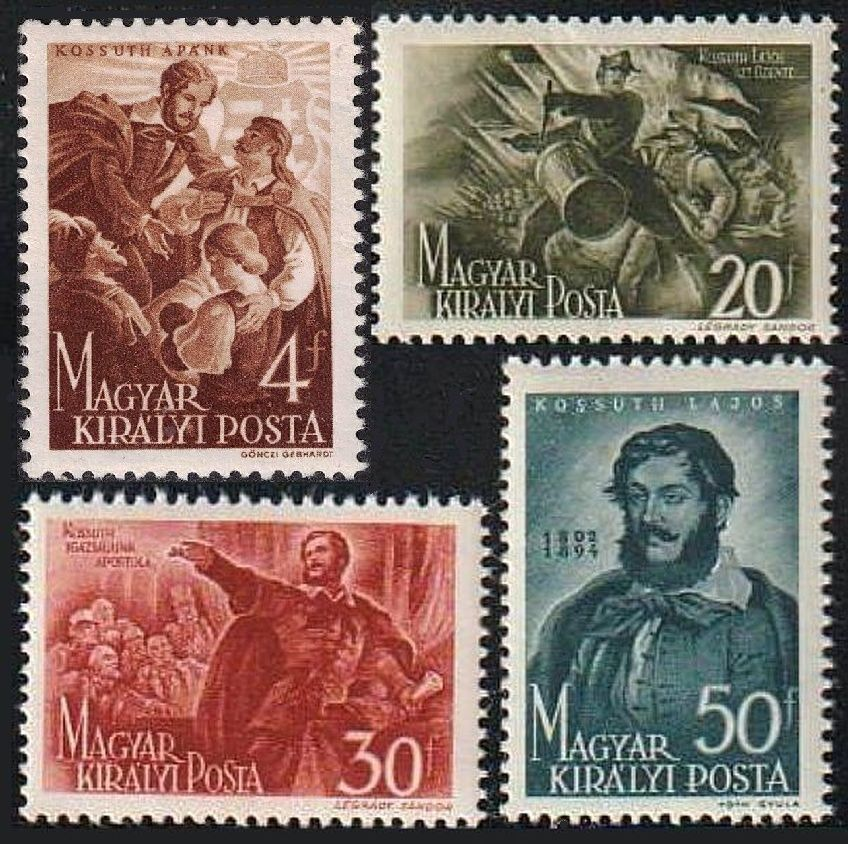
In 1944 the Hungarian government released four postage stamps in Lajos Kossuth's honor

The main square of Budapest with the Hungarian Parliament Building is named after Kossuth, and the Kossuth Memorial is an important scene of national ceremonies. Most cities in Hungary have streets named after Kossuth, see: Public place names of Budapest. The first public statue commemorating Kossuth was erected in Miskolc in 1898. Kossuth Rádió, the main radio station of Hungary, is named after Lajos Kossuth.

Béla Bartók also wrote a symphonic poem named Kossuth, the funeral march which was transcribed for piano and published in Bartók's lifetime.

The memorials to Lajos Kossuth in the territories lost by Hungary after World War I, and again after World War II, were sooner or later demolished in neighboring countries. A few of them were re-erected following the Revolutions of 1989 by local councils or private associations. They play an important role as symbols of national identity of the Hungarian minority. Magyar Posta paid homage to Kossuth by bringing out eight postage stamps. Again, a set of four stamps commemorating 50th anniversary of the death of Lajos Kossuth were issued by Hungary on 20 March 1944

=== Slovakia ===
The most important memorial outside the present-day borders of Hungary is a statue in Rožňava, that was knocked down twice but restored after much controversy in 2004.

Mlynská ulica in Košice, an important street in the historic city center used to be called Lajos Kossut utca for most of its history.

=== Romania ===
The only Kossuth statue that remained on its place after 1920 in Romania stands in Salonta. The demolished Kossuth Memorial of Târgu-Mureş was re-erected in 2001 in the little Székely village of Ciumani. The Kossuth Memorial in Arad, the work of Ede Margó from 1909, was removed by the order of the Brătianu government in 1925. However, a smaller statue depicting Kossuth talking with Nicolae Bălcescu was built in Arad, in the Reconciliation Park.

=== United Kingdom ===
There is a blue plaque on No. 39 Chepstow Villas, the house in Notting Hill in London, where Kossuth lived from 1850 to 1859. A street in Greenwich, also in London, is named Kossuth Street after him. There is a letter of support from Kossuth on display at the Wallace Monument, near Stirling. The building of the monument, dedicated to Scottish patriot William Wallace coincided with Kossuth's visit to Scotland.

=== Continental Europe ===
In Serbia there are two statues of Kossuth in Stara Moravica and Novi Itebej. Memorials in Ukraine are situated in Berehove and Tiachiv. Lajos Kossuth Street exists in the cities of Dnipro, Kryvyi Rih, Mukachevo, Tyachiv, Uzhhorod. The house where Kossuth lived in exile in Shumen, Bulgaria, has been turned into the Lajos Kossuth Memorial House, exhibiting documents and items related to Kossuth's work and the Hungarian Revolution. A street in the centre of the Bulgarian capital Sofia also bears his name.

The house where Kossuth lived when in exile, on Macar Street (meaning Hungarian Street in Turkish) in Kütahya, Turkey, is now a museum (Kossuth Evi Müzesi). The house is on a hill, with two stories in the back and one facing Macar Street. The walled back yard has a life size statue of Kossuth. The interior is furnished with period pieces, and houses a portrait of Kossuth and a map of his travels.

In Turin, Italy, there is a plaque on the building in which Kossuth lived, as well as a street bearing his name (Corso Luigi Kossuth). In Brescia there is a Square bearing his name.

=== United States ===
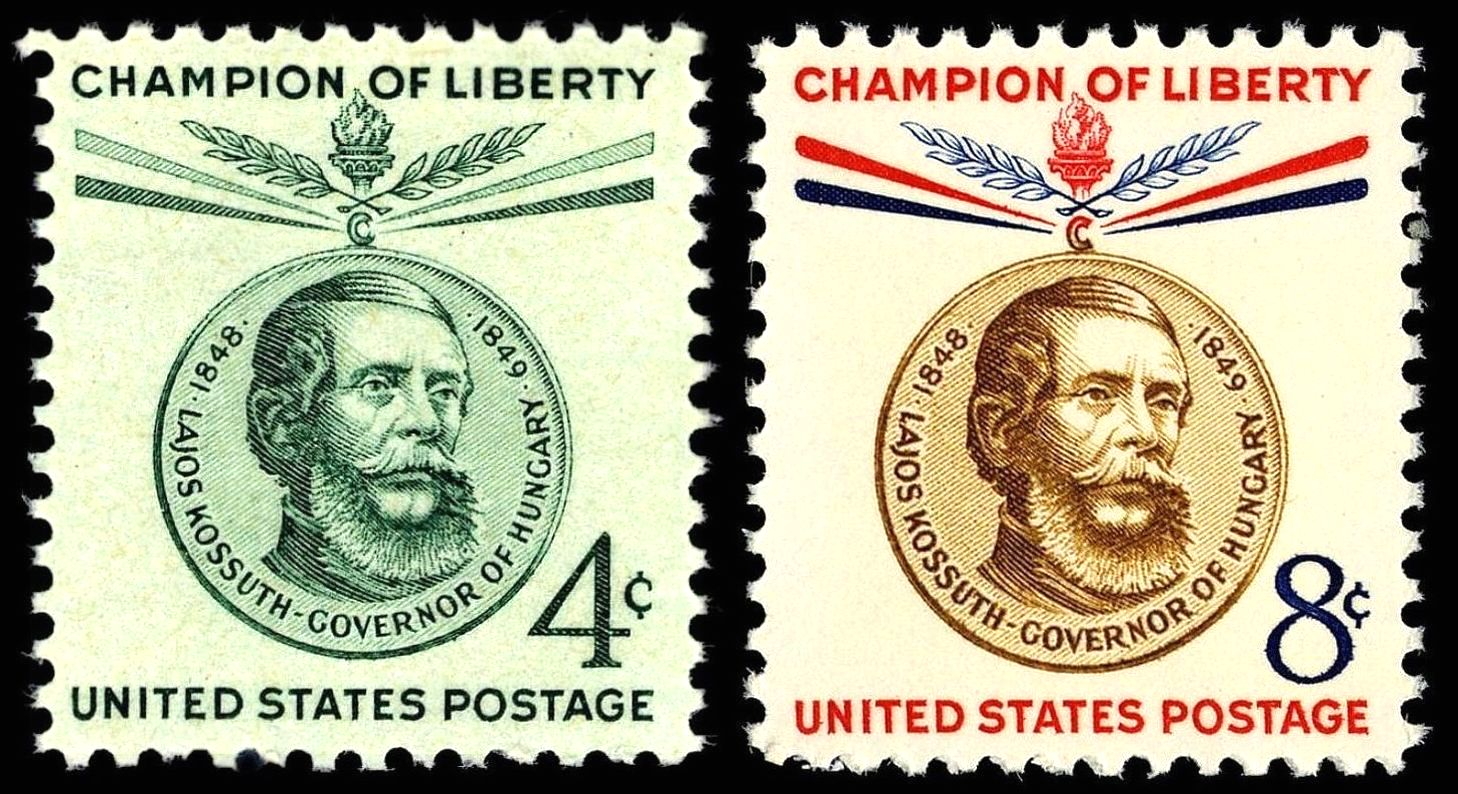
In 1958 the US Government issued two postage stamps honoring Lajos Kossuth; part of the Champion of Liberty commemorative series.

Kossuth County, Iowa, is named in Kossuth's honor. A statue of the freedom fighter stands in front of the county Court House in Algona, Iowa, the county seat. The small towns of Kossuth, Ohio, Kossuth, Mississippi, Kossuth, Maine, Kossuth, Pennsylvania, and Kossuth, Wisconsin, as well as a populated area within the town of Bolivar, New York are named in honor of Kossuth. Kossuthville, also known locally as K-Ville, is a residential neighborhood in Polk County, Florida.

A bust of Kossuth sits in the United States Capitol in Washington, D.C., which also boasts a Hungarian-American cultural center called Kossuth House (owned and operated by the Hungarian Reformed Federation of America). A statue of Kossuth stands in New York City on Riverside Drive at 113th Street near the Columbia University campus. Other statues of Kossuth are sprinkled throughout the US, including in University Circle in Cleveland, Ohio There is a Kossuth Park at the intersection of East 121st Street and East Shaker Boulevard, just west of Shaker Square, in Cleveland. There are streets named in his honor in the Bronx, Brooklyn, Utica, Ronkonkoma, and Bohemia in New York State; Newark, Haledon, and Wharton in New Jersey; St. Louis, Missouri; Bridgeport, Connecticut; Lafayette, Indiana; and Columbus, Ohio. There is also a neighborhood in Dayton, Ohio known as the Kossuth Colony Historic District.

During an impassioned eulogy of Kossuth in New York, Alexander Kohut, a distinguished rabbinic scholar, took ill, and died several weeks later.

The bust of Kossuth that was added to the United States Capitol in 1990 is presently displayed in that building's "Freedom Foyer" alongside busts of Václav Havel and Winston Churchill.

=== Canada ===
Kossuth Road in Cambridge, Ontario, Canada was named in Kossuth's honor as is Kossuth Park Wainfleet, Ontario Port Colborne, Ontario.

=== In Kurdistan, Iraq ===
The main street in Rawanduz was renamed in Kossuth's honor in 2017.

== Memorials ==
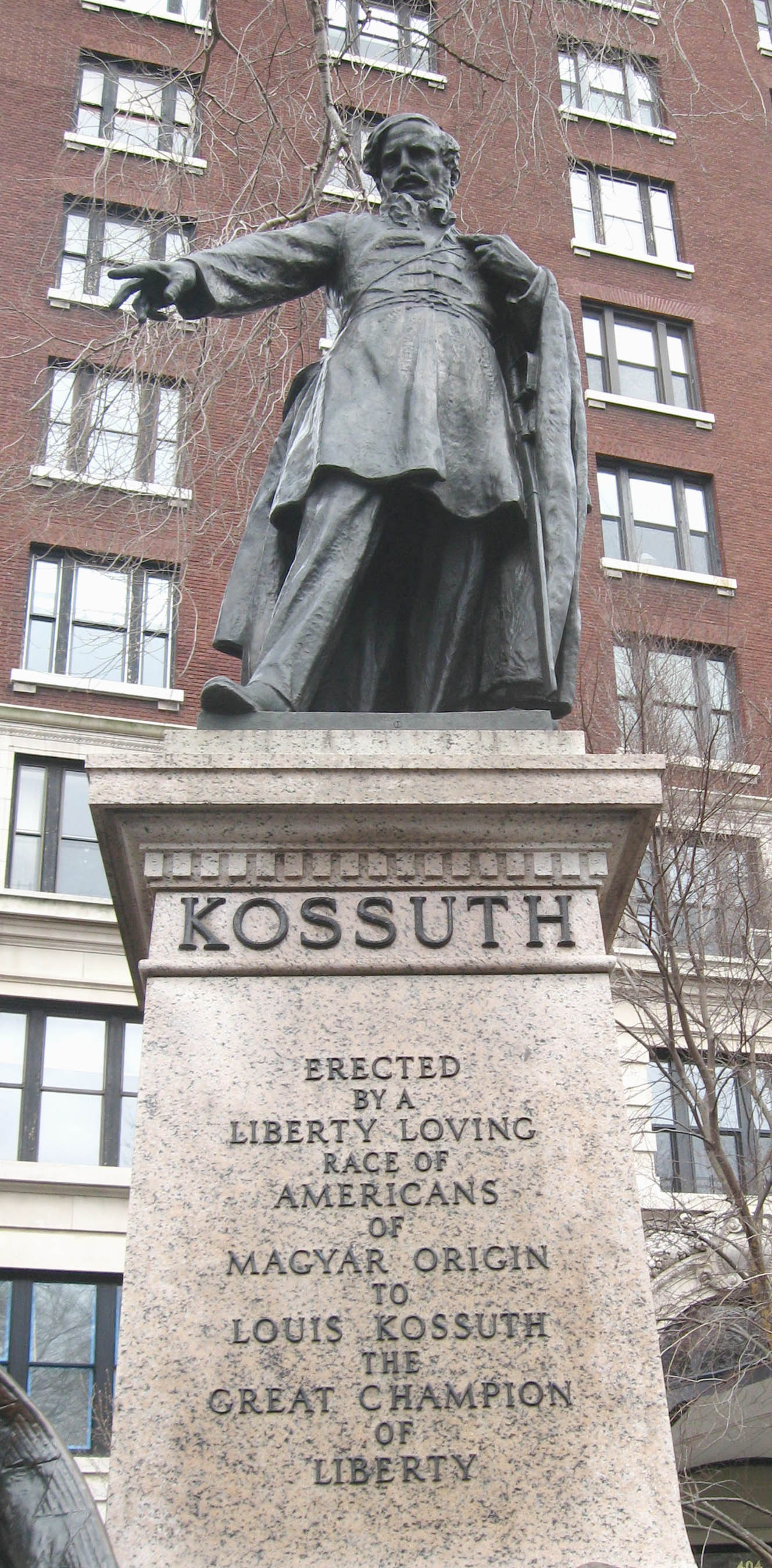
Kossuth statue in 113th Street and Riverside Drive, New York City

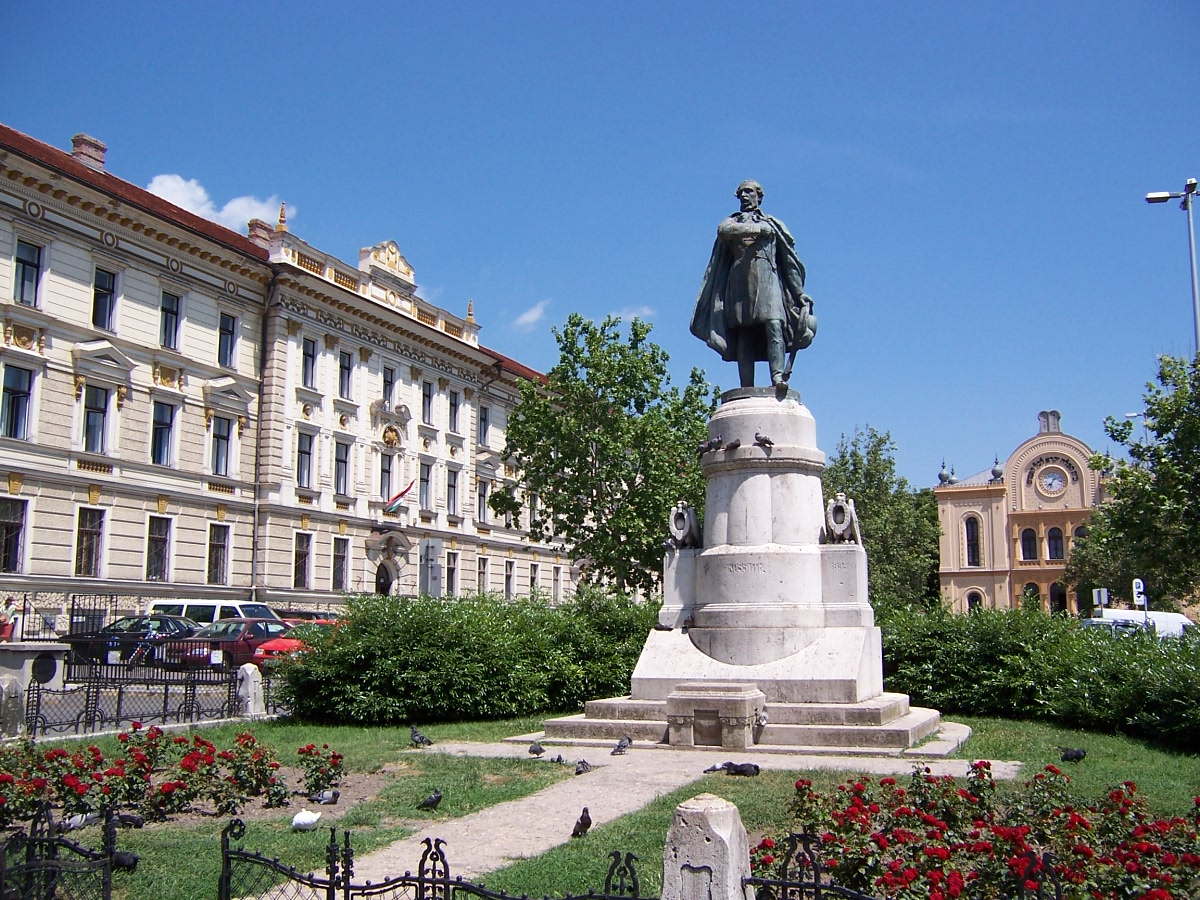
Kossuth statue in Pécs

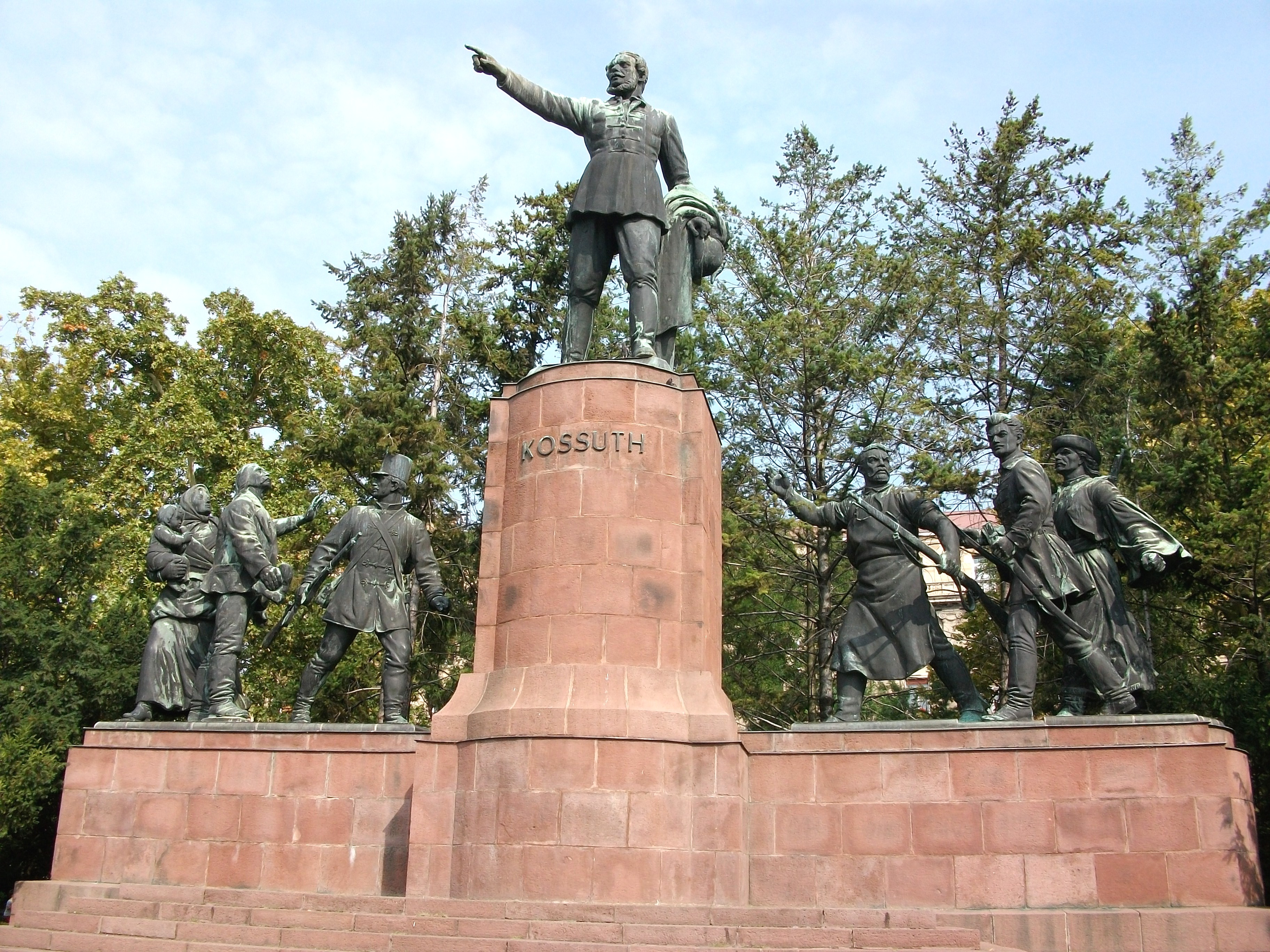
Kossuth Memorial, originally in Budapest, moved to Orczy Park in 2014.

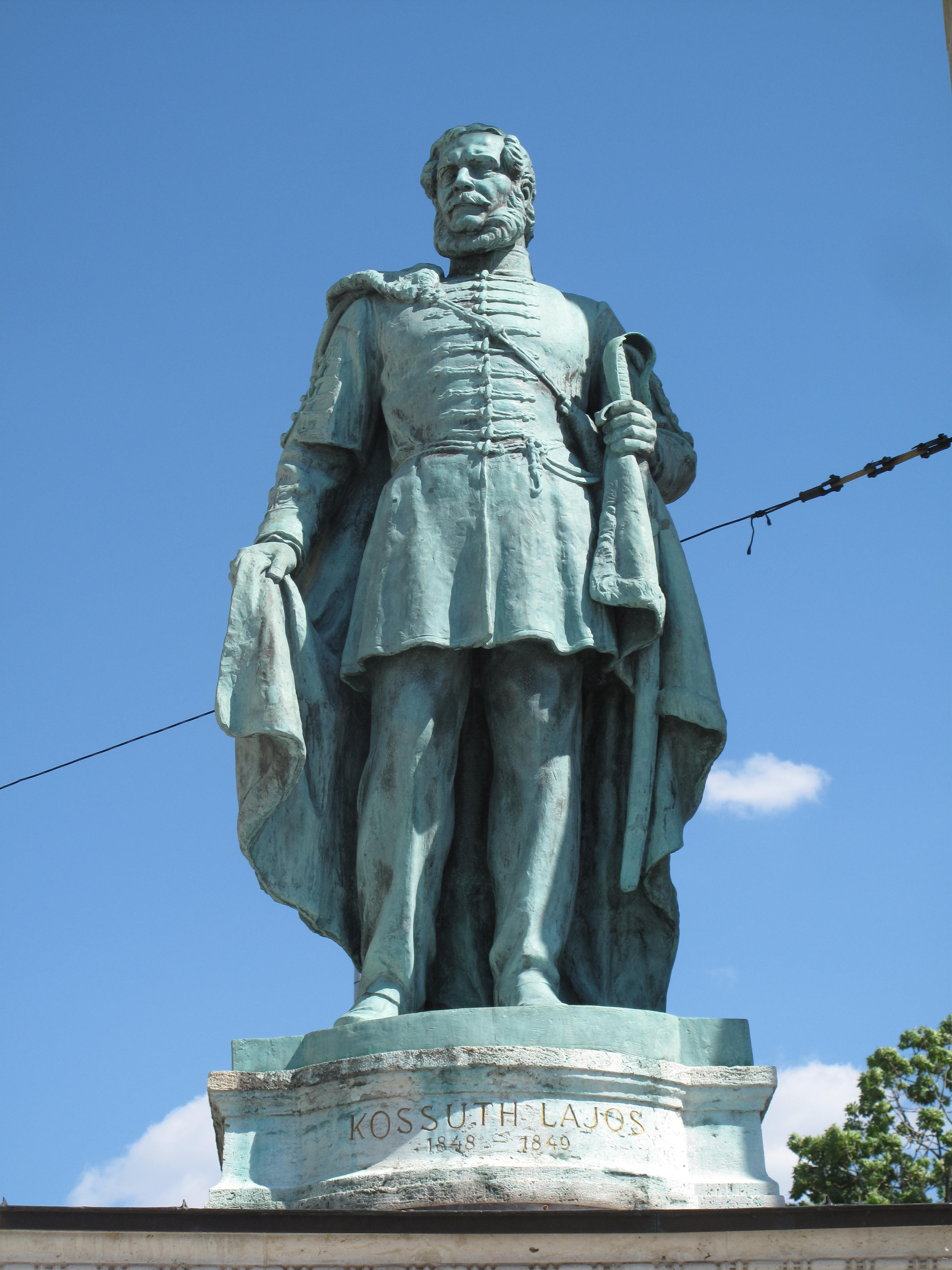
The statue of Kossuth on the Hősök tere (Heroes' Square), Budapest

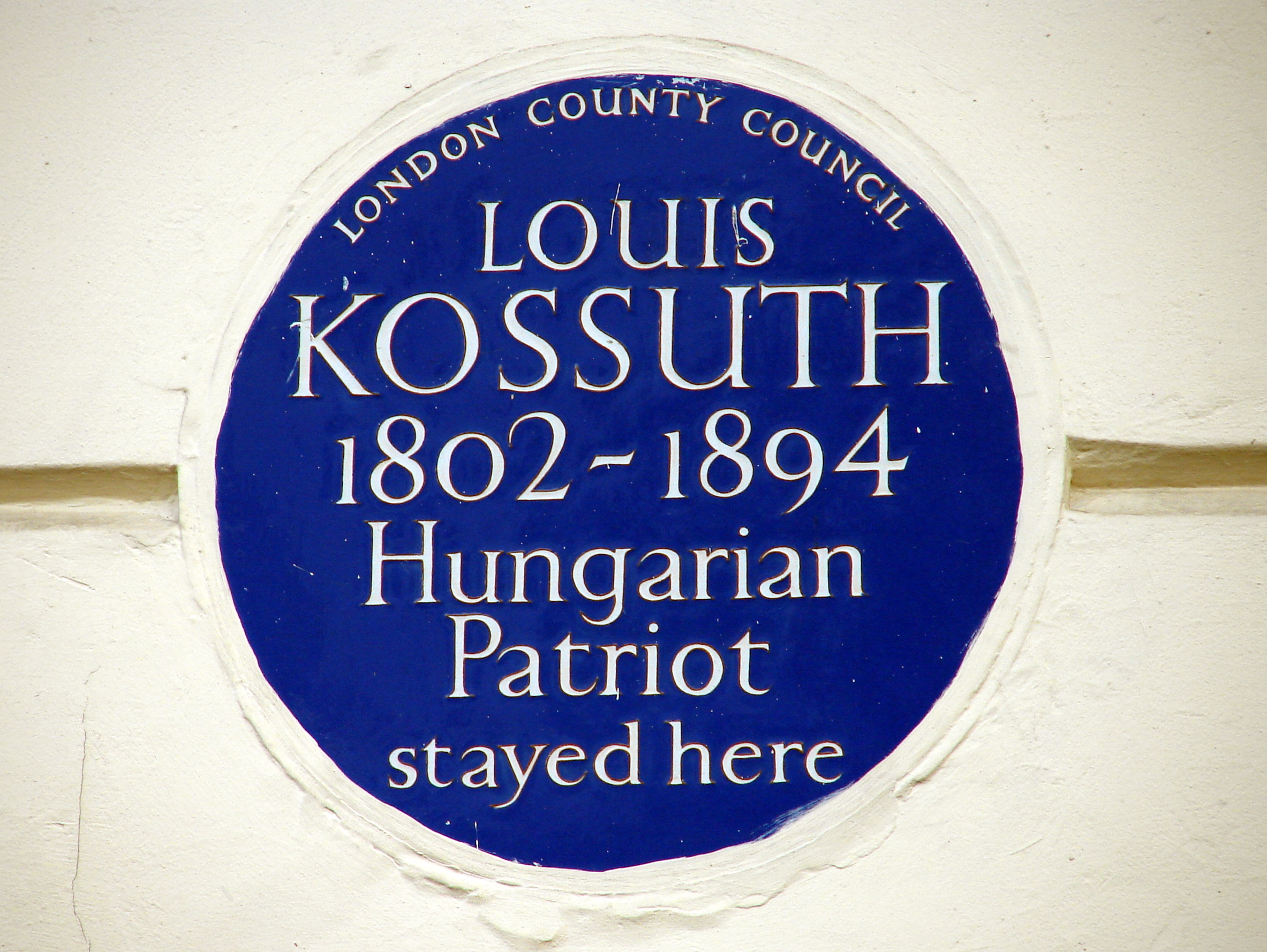
Kossuth blue plaque in London

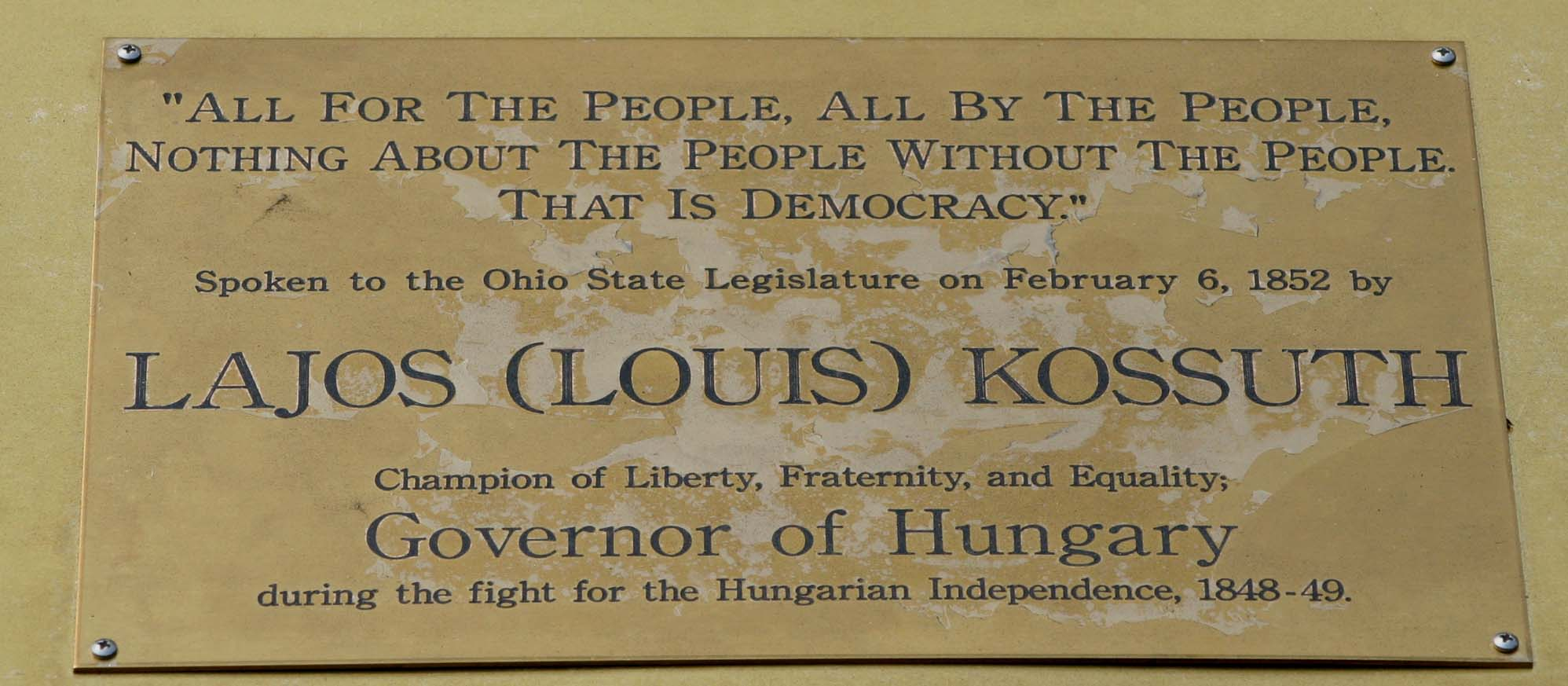
Kossuth Road in Cambridge, Canada

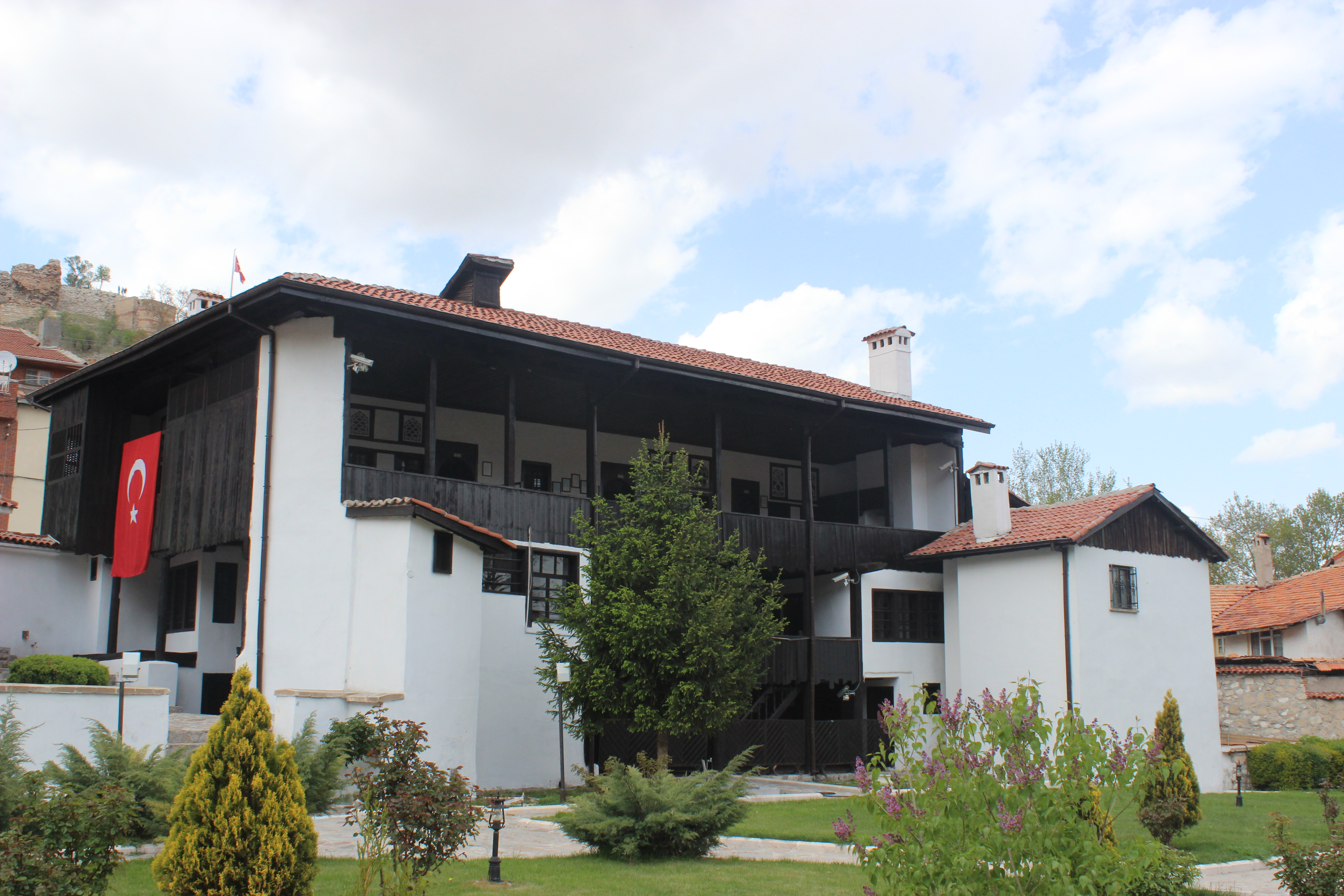
Kossuth Museum in Kütahya, Turkey

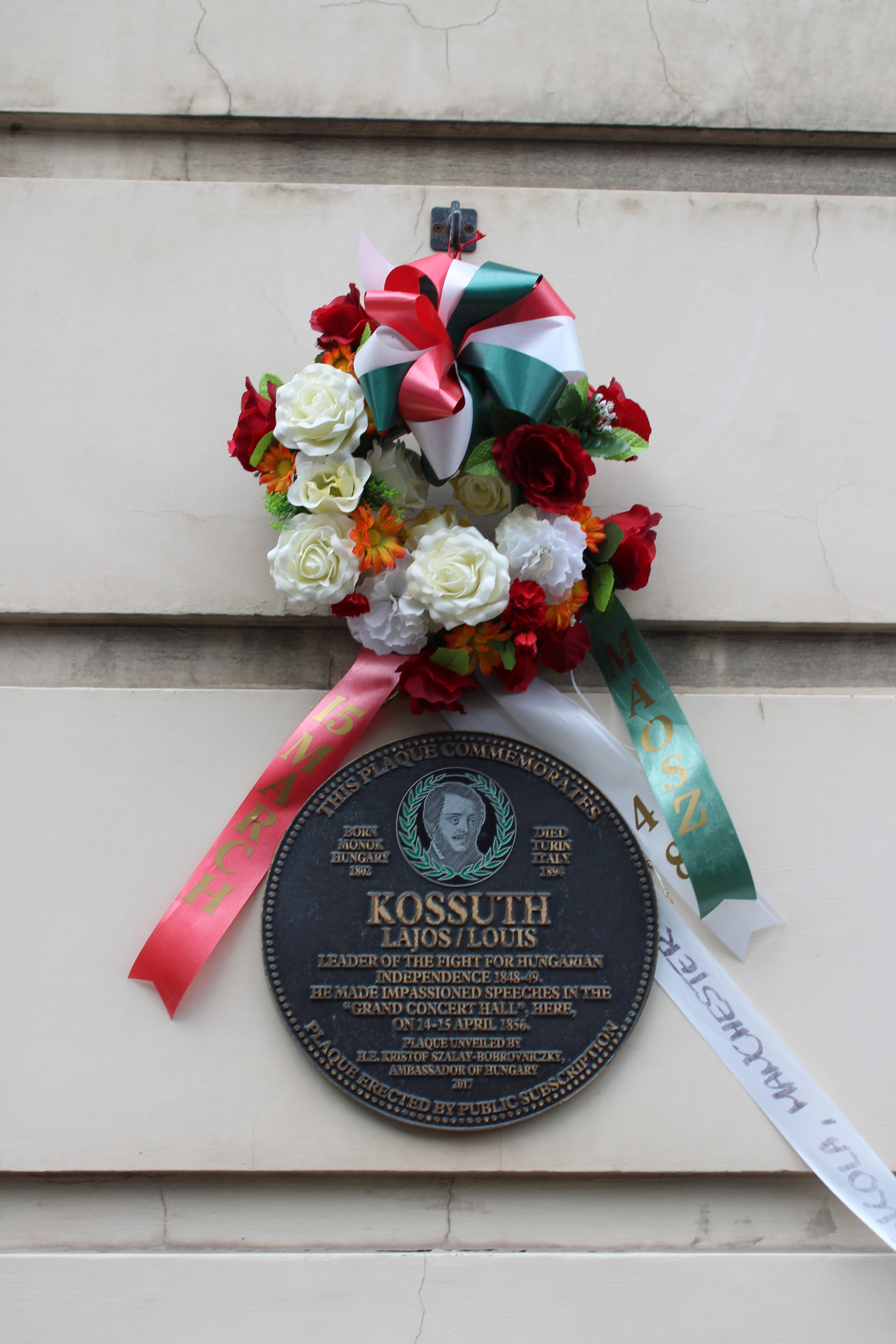
Plaque installed in 2017 commemorating speeches made in Liverpool in 1856

== Works ==
- Works by Lajos Kossuth at Project Gutenberg
- Memories of My Exile
- The Future of Nations
- Kossuth in New England: A Full Account of the Hungarian Governor's Visit to Massachusetts, with His Speeches
- The life of Louis Kossuth, Governor of Hungary, including notices of the men and scenes of the Hungarian revolution; to which is added an appendix containing his Principal speeches, &c
- Gesammelte Werke: Aus dem ungarischen "Selected Works" Vol. I
- Gesammelte Werke: Aus dem ungarischen "Selected Works" Vol. II
- Die Katastrophe in Ungarn By Lajos Kossuth
- Meine Schriften aus der Emigration By Lajos Kossuth'
- A Pragmatica sanctio Magyarországban. Történeti, jogi és politikai szempontokból By Charles, Lajos Kossuth
- Felelet gróf Széchenyi Istvánnak Kossuth Lajostól By Lajos Kossuth, gróf István Széchenyi

== Sources ==
- Spira, György (1959). A magyar forradalom 1848-49-ben ("The Hungarian Revolution in 1848-49") (in Hungarian). Budapest: A Magyar Tudományos Akadémia Történettudományi Intézete. p. 678.

Political offices
Preceded by post created	Minister of Finance; 1848	Succeeded by Lajos Batthyány
Preceded by Lajos Batthyány as Prime Minister	President of the Committee of National Defence; 1848–1849	Succeeded by Bertalan Szemere as Prime Minister
Preceded by post created	Governor-President of Hungary; 1849	Succeeded by Artúr Görgey as acting civil and military authority
