= Konin–Pątnów railway =

Railway line in Poland

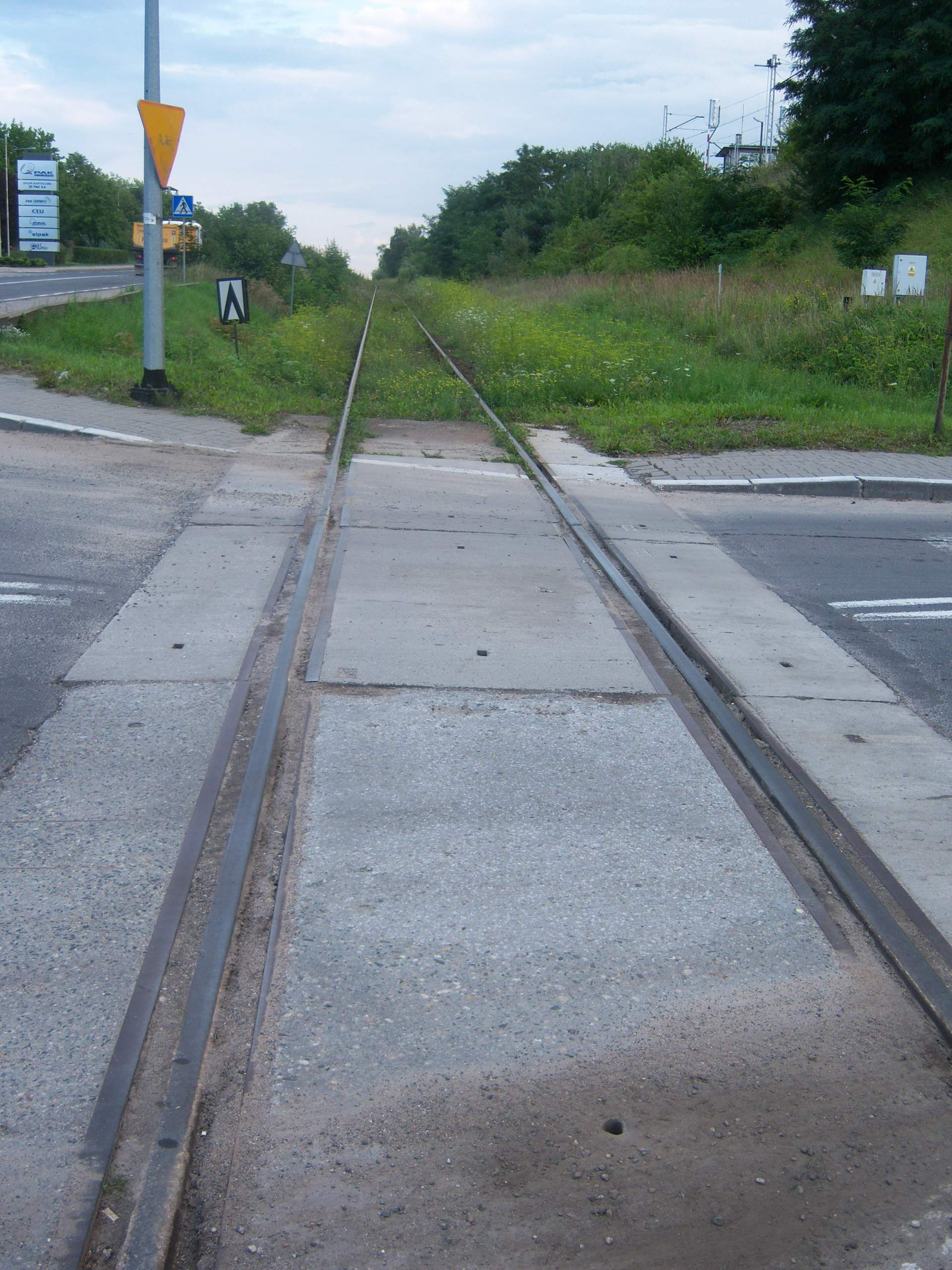
- Konin–Pątnów railway near Gosławice railway station

Overview
- Owner: PKP Polskie Linie Kolejowe
- Line number: 388
- Termini: Pątnów; Konin

History
- Opened: 1974
- Closed: 2015 (Pątnów–Kazimierz Biskupi)

Technical
- Line length: 9.213 km (5.725 mi)
- Track gauge: 1,435 mm (4 ft 8 1/2 in)
- Operating speed: Konin–Konin Niesłusz: 40 km/h Konin Niesłusz–Pątnów: 30 km/h
Route map
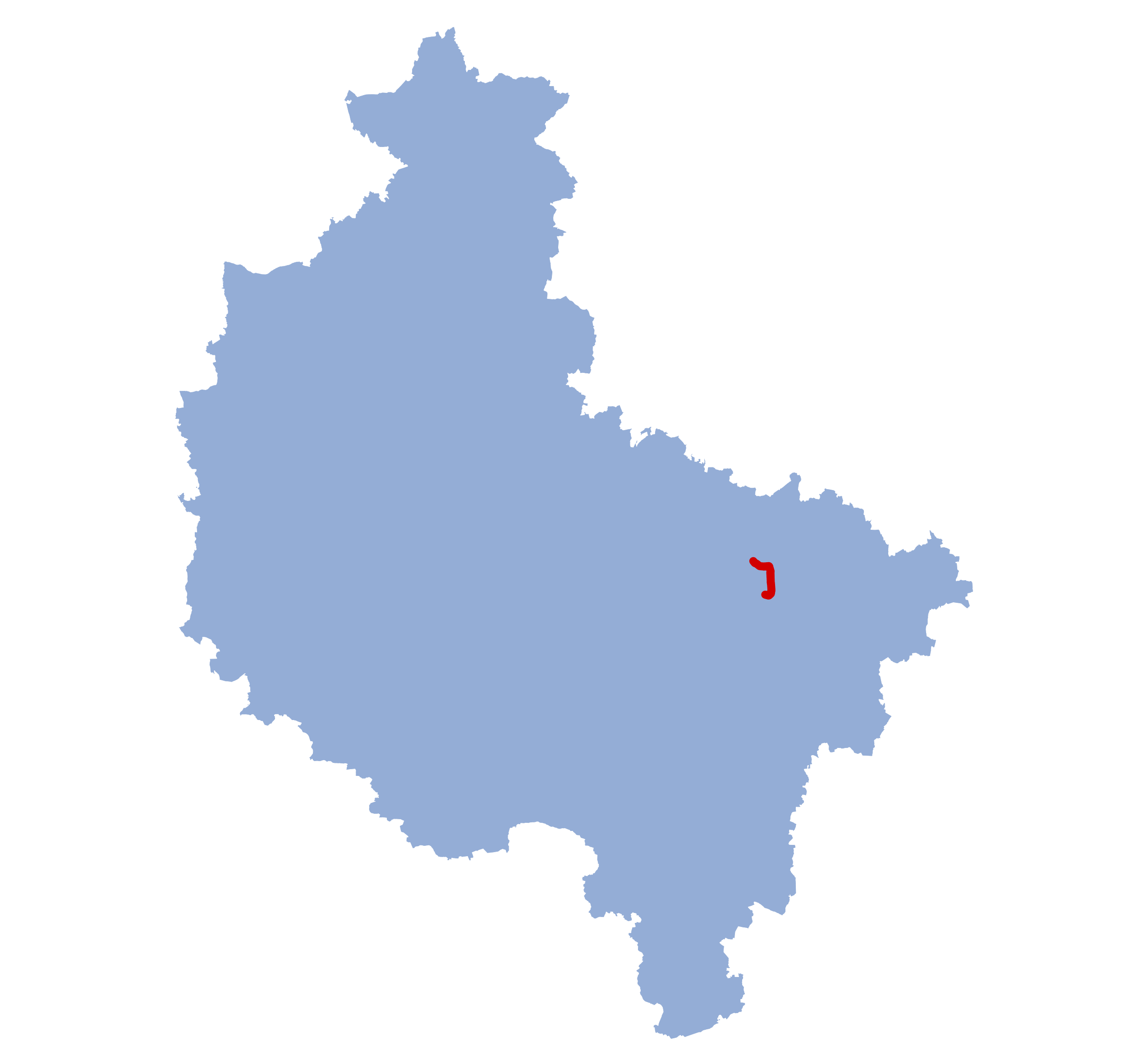

Konin–Pątnów railway (since 2013, Konin–Pątnów siding route, track 1P) was a non-electrified, single-track local railway with a length of 9.213 km. Until 1996, the line extended to Kazimierz Biskupi (total length of 14.226 km). In mid-1974, the first scheduled passenger train operated on the line, with passenger traffic continuing until May 1996. Since then, only occasional freight traffic has occurred. The original purpose of the line was to connect Konin's industrial districts with the city center. In 2013, it was removed from the PKP Polskie Linie Kolejowe railway register and converted into the Konin–Pątnów siding route, track 1P.

== Route ==
Konin–Pątnów railway began at Konin railway station, branching off to the left from Warsaw–Kunowice railway. It then ran northward parallel to National Road No. 25, passing near the Konin Power Plant, before turning west and ending beyond Pątnów railway station, north of Gosławskie Lake. From approximately the 6th kilometer of the line, the electrified tracks of Konin Mining Railways run parallel, sharing a common loading and unloading point at the Przesmyk-Gaj junction. Until 1996, the line passed the Lubstów Main Line viaduct, the Pątnów Power Plant, and changed direction northward again, terminating in Kazimierz Biskupi.

The entire line was located within the city of Konin. Until 1996, it ran through two gminas – Konin and Kazimierz Biskupi – and three cities: Konin, Olszowe, and Kazimierz Biskupi. The entire route lay within the Gniezno Lakeland mesoregion.

== Technical characteristics ==
The entire length of the line was a single track with a rail gauge of 1,435 mm and was managed by the regional branch in Poznań. The operational speed was 40 km/h up to the 1.618-kilometer mark, while the remaining section was limited to 30 km/h. Additionally, usage restrictions were imposed on the line – operation was not permitted from Monday to Friday between 12:01 AM–6:00 AM and 10:00 PM–12:00 AM, on Saturdays between 12:01 AM–6:00 AM and 6:00 PM–12:00 AM, and throughout the entire day on Sundays. The line was classified as C3, meaning the maximum axle load was 196 kN/axle (20.0 t/axle), and the maximum linear load was 71 kN/m (7.2 t/m). The route was not equipped with automatic train braking magnets.

Kilometer		Speed
from	to	track 1
-0.163	1.618	40 km/h
1.618	9.050	30 km/h

== History ==
The history of the Konin–Kazimierz Biskupi railway dates back to the 1920s when Konin was connected by a narrow-gauge line to Anastazewo and Sompolno. The Anastazewo–Konin Wąskotorowy railway was built in 1912 thanks to the efforts of the Gosławice Sugar Factory, but it was not until World War I that the German military extended the line to the village of Czarków, near Konin. It was a single-track passenger and freight line, in operation until 1965 when the Anastazewo–Konin Wąskotorowy railway tracks were dismantled between Jabłonka Słupecka railway station and Konin, as the Konin Coal Mine began removing the tracks for the Kazimierz Południe open-pit mine.

In the 1950s and 1960s, four large industrial plants were established in the northern part of Konin: the Konin and Pątnów power plants, the Konin Aluminum Plant, and the Konin Repair Works for Brown Coal Industry. Due to the significant distance between these industrial sites and residential areas, Konin faced a challenge in transporting workers to Gosławice and Pątnów, which were incorporated into the city's boundaries in 1976.

In 1971, preparations began for the construction of a railway from the main station to the north, through Gosławice and Pątnów, to Kazimierz Biskupi. A tunnel under Warsaw–Kunowice railway was extended to the newly constructed third platform, from which trains to the northern region would depart. At the same time, a locomotive depot was built to serve the new line. The first scheduled trains to Kazimierz Biskupi began operating on 26 May 1974.

From 1996 to 2000, there were plans to electrify the line; however, after it was closed to passenger traffic in 1995, these plans were abandoned. Another unrealized project was the extension of the line further north towards Kleczew and Orchowo.

In June 1999, for the occasion of Pope John Paul II's seventh pilgrimage to Poland, passenger trains running on Konin–Pątnów railway and the Lubstów Main Line were launched from Konin to Licheń Stary, transporting pilgrims to the Basilica of Our Lady of Licheń. This connection was made possible through an agreement between PKP Polskie Linie Kolejowe and the Konin Coal Mine.

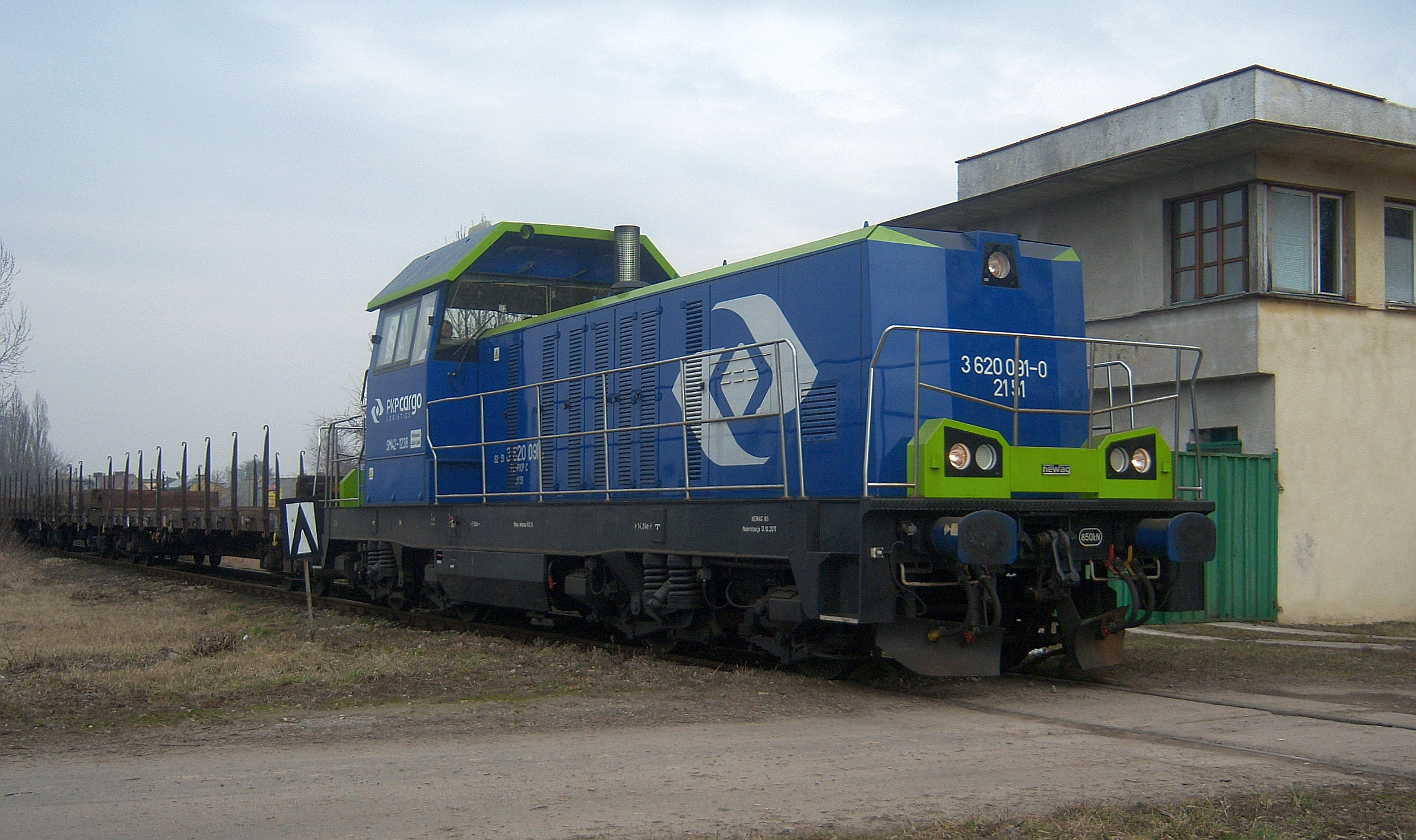
SM42-1238 of PKP Cargo passing the railway station in Maliniec

According to the railways list published by PKP Polskie Linie Kolejowe on 29 April 2013, the Konin–Pątnów railway was removed from the D29 list. The trackbed was transformed into the Konin–Pątnów siding, track 1P.

On 22 July 2013, Polish State Railways announced a tender for the demolition of over 1,000 railway objects, including the stations located on the line. A month later, the results of the electronic auction were announced, with the Marian Michalak Construction Company winning in the Greater Poland Voivodeship. In 2014, the platforms at Kazimierz Biskupi and Pątnów Elektrownia railway stations were dismantled, and in January 2015, the tracks between Pątnów and Kazimierz Biskupi were removed along with the platforms at the Pątnów railway station.

=== Timetable ===
In its initial period of operation, in 1974, the line handled 12 pairs of passenger trains on the full route and 5 pairs of trains on the shortened route Konin–Maliniec. In 1985, the line operated 14 pairs of trains. 10 years later (1995), this number had decreased to only 4 pairs, while in 1996, the final year of passenger service, only 2 pairs remained.

== Infrastructure ==
=== Operating points ===
Name of the railway station	Photo	Number of platform edges	Infrastructure	Source
Konin		6	signal boxes (Kn, Kn2); loading ramp; underground passage; water tower (now an art gallery)	
Konin Niesłusz (inactive)		3	platform shelter (demolished); signal box (demolished); loading ramp	
Konin Marantów (inactive)		2	platform shelter (demolished)	
Maliniec (delivery and collection point, former railway station)		2	platform shelter (demolished); signal box; FUGO–Maliniec delivery and collection point	
Konin Elektrownia (junction)		0	signal box (demolished); sidings to Lafarge Cement and Konin Power Plant	
Gosławice (inactive)		2	platform shelter (demolished); signal box (demolished)	
Pątnów (delivery and collection point, former railway station)		1	platform shelter (demolished); signal boxes (one converted into a residential house; the other, in the Pm district, vandalized); delivery and collection point to the Lubstów Mainline of KWB Konin	
Pątnów Elektrownia (demolished)		1	platform shelter (demolished); signal box (vandalized)	
Kazimierz Biskupi (demolished)		2	station building (now a residential house); platform shelter (demolished)	
