= Rail transport in Konin =

Rail transport history and infrastructure in Konin, Poland

The history of rail transport in Konin began in the early 20th century with the establishment of a narrow-gauge railway in the then-village of Gosławice to transport sugar beets to the Gosławice Sugar Factory. Within the current city boundaries, there is one railway station and 8 standard-gauge stops, only one of which serves passengers. The Konin railway station lies on the international E 20 railway (Berlin–Moscow).

== History ==
The earliest plans for a Poznań–Konin–Warsaw railway connection emerged in the mid-19th century, initiated by merchants and industrialists from both the Prussian and Russian partitions. These plans failed due to the military policies of Imperial Russia. Fearing war with Prussia, Russia blocked railway construction west of the Vistula river to hinder potential enemy advances. Despite this, various railway lines with different gauges were built in the Russian partition, bypassing Konin.

This situation persisted until the second decade of the 20th century. The development of railways in the then-suburban village of Gosławice was tied to the construction of a sugar factory, which began in September 1911. A month later, the factory's management commissioned Orenstein & Koppel – Arthur Koppel AG to design and build a narrow-gauge railway. Due to private funding, construction progressed quickly, and between April and November 1912, a 30 km section with a 750 mm gauge was completed, connecting the sugar factory to the Anastazewo border station by Anastazewo–Konin Wąskotorowy railway.

During World War I, the Konin Land was occupied by German forces. By the end of 1914, a new section of the narrow-gauge railway from Pątnów Mały to Czarków village was opened. In early 1915, the occupiers established a provisional station, creating the first Konin station.

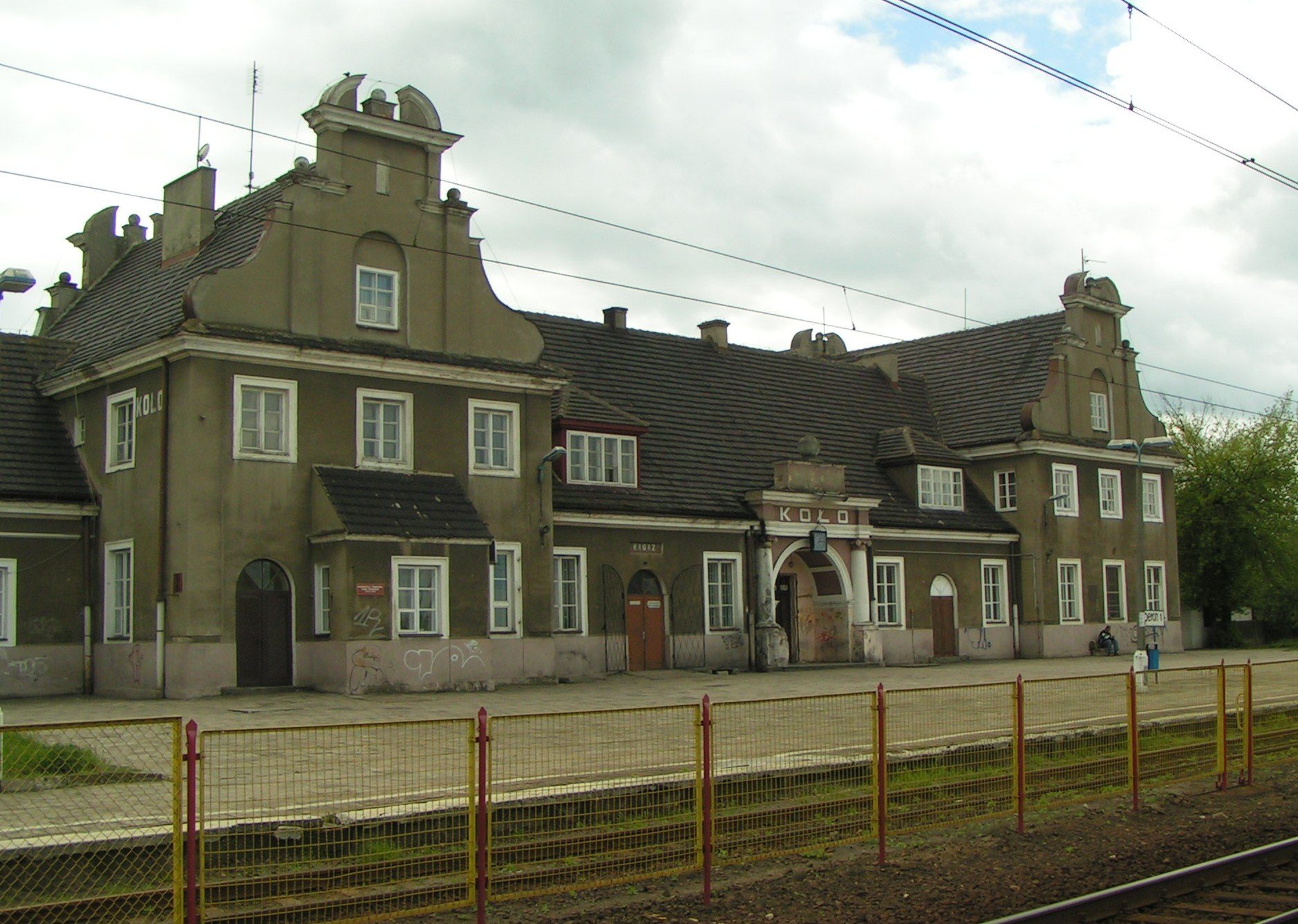
Building similar to the Koło railway station stood in Konin from around 1926 to 1977

Following Poland's independence, efforts began to rebuild and expand railway infrastructure. In April 1919, a resolution authorized the construction of the Strzałkowo–Konin–Kutno railway, enabling direct travel from Poznań to Warsaw. Construction, interrupted by the Polish-Soviet War and material shortages, was completed in November 1925. That same year, an industrial spur to the Gosławice sugar factory was opened. In 1920, as the standard-gauge station was organized, the narrow-gauge railway's route was altered to terminate at the station's northern end. In the 1930s, plans for the Polish Coal Trunk-Line through Konin were considered but ultimately bypassed the city.

In September 1939, during the Invasion of Poland, the Third Reich attacked Poland. In the first week, two Junkers Ju 87 dive-bomber raids targeted Konin's station, resulting in civilian and railway worker casualties, damage to the station and infrastructure, and disruption of east-west rail connections. In November, the railway in Greater Poland was incorporated into the Reichsbahndirektion Posen, and repairs to the damaged railways began swiftly. In summer 1940, under the Otto Program for Operation Barbarossa, Germany expanded and modernized important transport routes, including the Poznań–Konin–Kutno railway. By 1943, a second track was added to this section, and Konin saw the construction of railway facilities such as signal boxes, a locomotive depot, a water tower, a turntable, and housing for railway workers. The station was expanded with additional tracks for passenger, freight, and shunting operations. In late 1943, as the war turned in favor of the Allies, Germany scaled back further railway investments. In January 1945, the Red Army entered Konin, and in February, the east-west railway's gauge was changed from 1,435 mm to 1,524 mm for Soviet military transports.

After the war, the tracks were converted back to standard gauge, and the station and railway were placed under the Łódź Regional Directorate of State Railways. From the early 1950s, under the Six-Year Plan, economic activity, including rail transport, was revitalized. The capacity of the standard-gauge railway through Konin was increased, the narrow-gauge station was expanded, and a brick locomotive shed was built. In the same decade, the German locomotive depot was converted into a first-class wagon repair facility, accompanied by a railway fire brigade. On 1 July 1958, the Łódź Directorate was dissolved, and Konin station was transferred to the Poznań Directorate of Railways. In 1959, a reinforced concrete viaduct was built over the tracks of the current Warsaw–Kunowice railway along Przemysłowa Street.

In March 1961, electrification of the Poznań–Konin–Kutno line began. On 29 September 1962, the first electric train arrived from Kutno to Konin, and nearly 19 months later, electric trains reached Poznań. Electrification prompted modernization of signaling, track layouts, and platforms, as well as the construction of a tunnel for platform 2. In 1965, due to the expansion of the Konin Coal Mine north of the city, the narrow-gauge railway section on Anastazewo–Konin Wąskotorowy railway was dismantled, ending over 50 years of narrow-gauge operations in Konin.

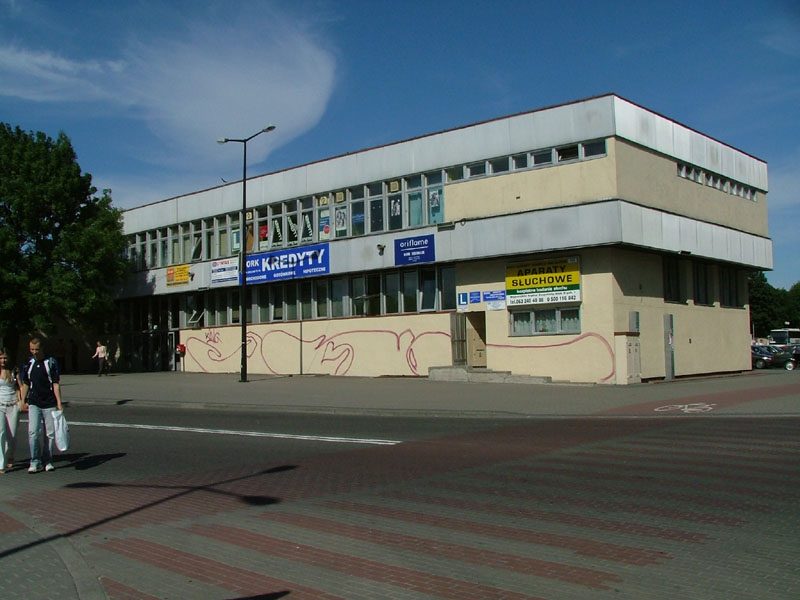
Konin railway station building from 1977

Five years after the narrow-gauge tracks were removed, efforts began to reconnect the northern region to central Konin by rail. By mid-1974, a single-track, non-electrified railway was opened from Konin station northward through the then-localities of Maliniec, Gosławice, Pątnów, to Kazimierz Biskupi. The 15 km standard-gauge Konin–Pątnów railway, designated by the Polish State Railways as number 388, facilitated worker transport to the Konin Coal Mine open-pit mines, Konin and Pątnów power plants, Konin Aluminium Smelter, and Open-Pit Mining Equipment Factory.

In the mid-1970s, construction began on a new brick-and-metal station building, designed as a combined railway, bus, and postal facility. The western wing opened in February 1977, and shortly afterward, the 1926 station building was demolished. Funding cuts halted further work, and the wing intended for PKS Konin was reassigned to the railway.

In the 1980s, several investments were made around the main station: a footbridge was built east of the station, the passenger tunnel was extended to the Zatorze district, and the Briański Viaduct was constructed over Warsaw–Kunowice railway along Kleczewska Street. On 1 June 1984, the two-platform Konin Zachód railway station in the Chorzeń district was opened.

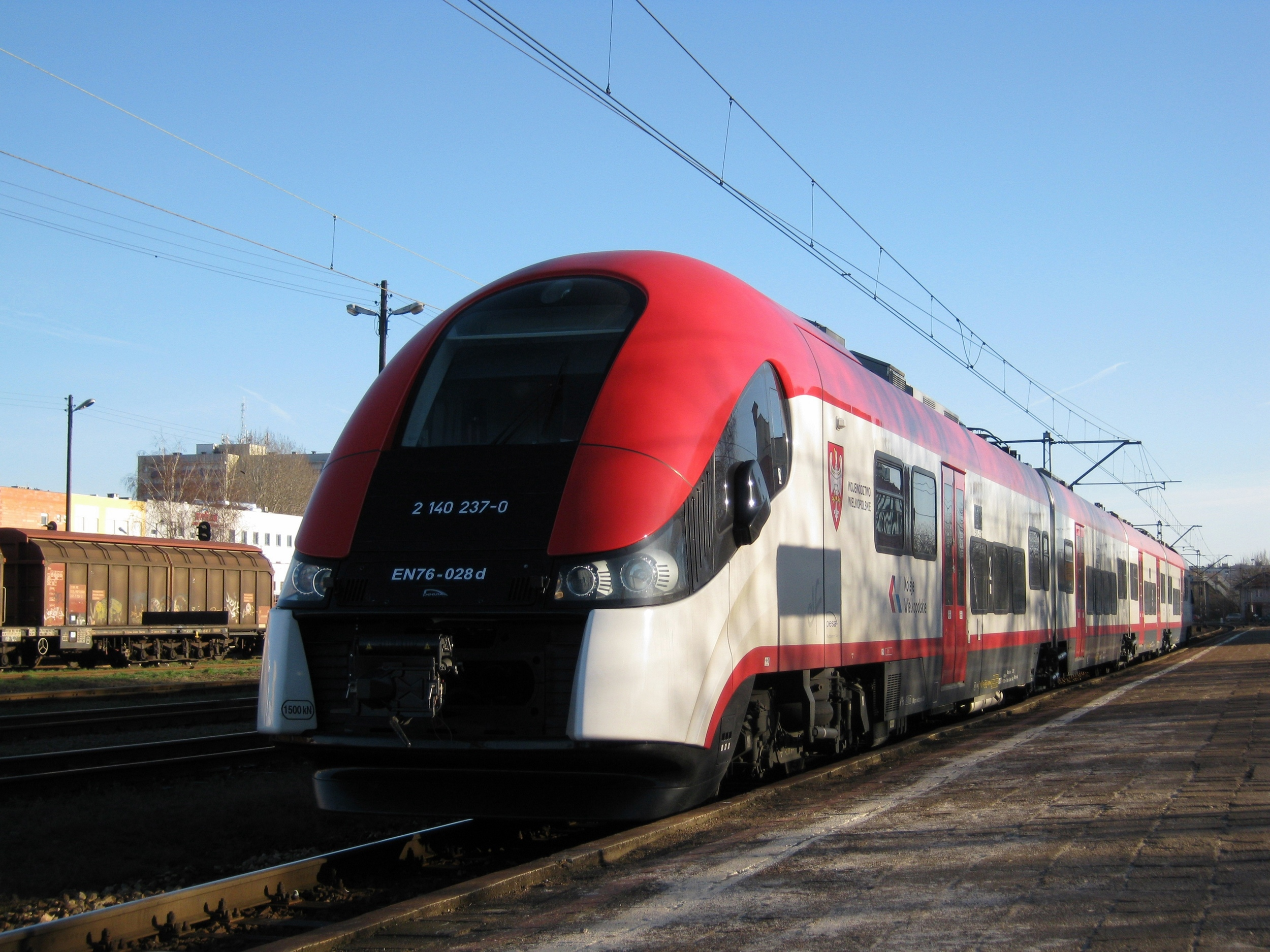
EN76 of Greater Poland Railways at Konin railway station

From the late 1980s to the 1990s, rail transport, both passenger and freight, declined, leading to the demolition of many railway buildings. In May 1995, the last scheduled passenger train departed for Kazimierz Biskupi. Between 1998 and 1999, the tracks and signaling system on Warsaw–Kunowice railway were modernized.

On 9 December 2012, with the introduction of the 2012/2013 timetable, Greater Poland Railways trains began operating in Konin.

In May 2013, plans were announced for a major renovation of Konin's station, but in November, it was decided to demolish the existing building and construct a new one. By June 2014, a local spatial development plan and design for the new station were to be prepared, with construction set to begin in 2015. The plans envisioned a combined railway, PKS, and international bus terminal, adapted for people with disabilities, with a redeveloped parking area and modernized platforms in the long term. In mid-2014, construction was delayed due to the lack of an investor, which the Polish State Railways began seeking in April. The railway's "Small Development Projects" initiative proposed a new station with commercial and office spaces, with similar plans for stations in Mińsk Mazowiecki, Dębica, and Oświęcim. By early 2015, investors were secured to fund the new station, estimated at 38 million PLN, with construction planned to start in late 2016 or early 2017 and last approximately 12 months.

== Railways ==
=== Standard-gauge ===
Until 2013, Konin station was a junction station, where two railways intersected: the double-track, mainline, electrified Warsaw–Kunowice railway and the single-track, non-electrified Konin–Pątnów railway, classified as a local line until April 2013. The tracks of Konin–Pątnów railway were converted into a Konin–Pątnów siding, track 1P.

Warsaw–Kunowice railway serves both passenger and freight traffic, while the former Konin–Pątnów railway has been limited to freight since passenger services were suspended in 1996.

In 2014, the platforms at Pątnów Elektrownia railway station were dismantled, and in January 2015, the tracks on the Pątnów–Kazimierz Biskupi section were removed, along with the platforms at Pątnów.

=== Narrow-gauge ===
The Anastazewo–Konin Wąskotorowy railway, operational in Konin since 1914, was dismantled along with its stations in 1965 due to the construction of the Kazimierz Południe open-pit mine by Konin Coal Mine.

== Operating points ==
=== Active ===
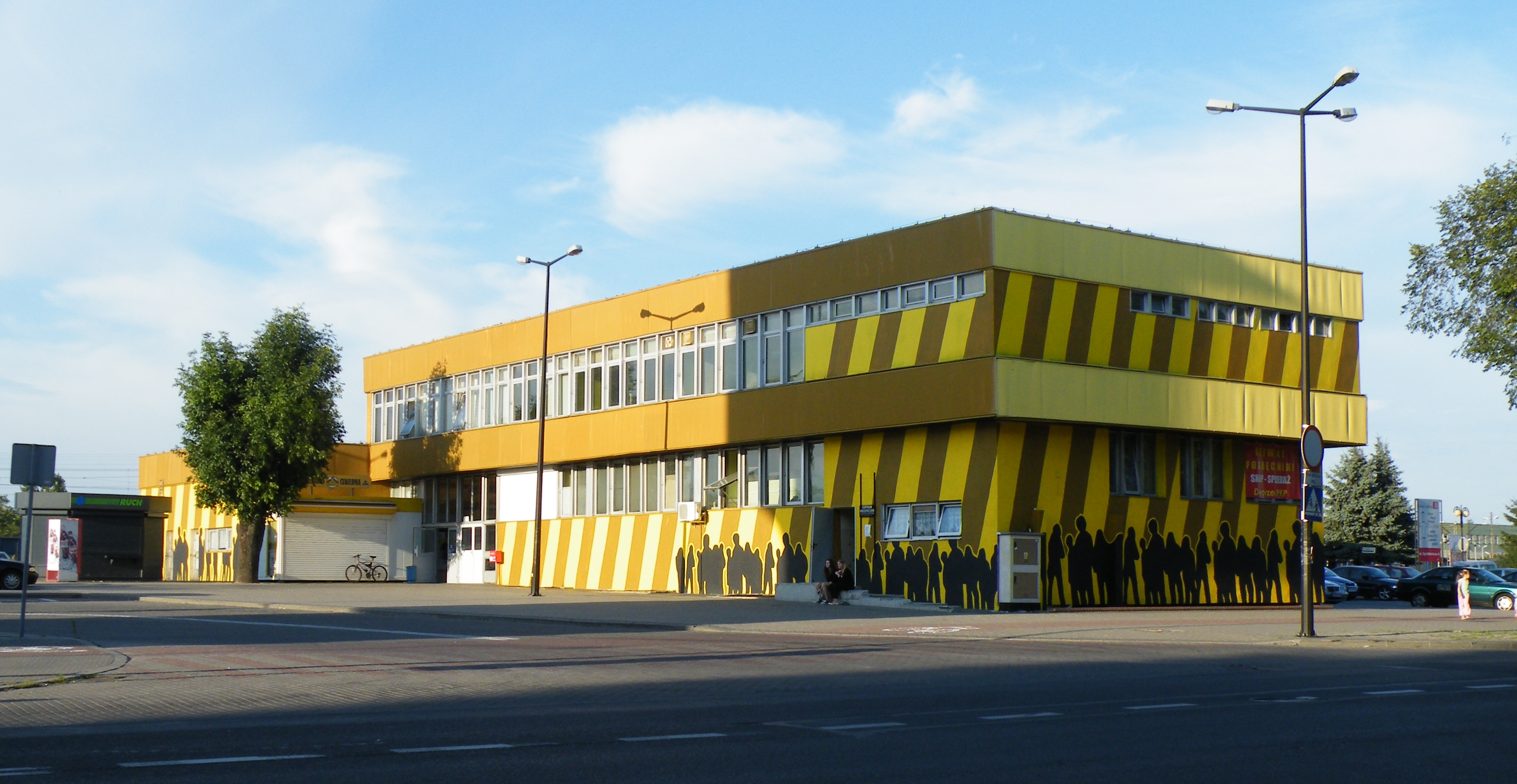
Konin railway station building

Konin has two active passenger facilities: Konin railway station, located in the new city center at 1 Kolejowa Street, and the Konin Zachód railway station in the Chorzeń district. Both are on Warsaw–Kunowice railway.

Name	Type	Year opened	Number of platform edges	Infrastructure
Konin	Railway station	1921	5 (3 active)	Ticket offices Ticket machines Waiting room Underground passages Water tower Ramps
Konin Zachód	Railway station	1986	2	

=== Inactive standard-gauge ===
Between 1974 and 1996, six railway stations were in use on Konin–Pątnów railway:

Name	Type	Year opened	Year closed
Gosławice	Railway station	1974	1996
Konin Marantów	Railway station	1974	1996
Konin Niesłusz	Railway station	1974	1996
Maliniec	Railway station	1974	1996
Pątnów	Railway station	1974	1996

=== Dismantled standard-gauge ===
Name	Type	Year opened	Year closed	Year dismantled
Pątnów Elektrownia	Railway station	1974	1996	2014

=== Dismantled narrow-gauge ===
From 1914, Konin and its surroundings had six railway stations and one narrow-gauge station. All were dismantled with the Anastazewo–Konin Wąskotorowy railway in 1965:

Name	Type	Year opened	Year closed	Year dismantled
Gosławice Wąskotorowe	Railway station	1914	1965	1965
Konin Czarków	Railway station	1915	1965	1965
Konin Wąskotorowy (German: Konin Schmalspurbahnhof)	Railway station	1921	1965	1965
Maliniec	Railway station	1915	1965	1965
Marantów	Railway station	1915	1965	1965
Pątnów	Railway station	1914	1965	1965
Pątnów Mały	Railway station	1914	1965	1965

=== Standard-gauge sidings ===
Siding	Type	From station From line
KWB Konin Briquette Plant (now Konin Coal Mine)	Track siding	Konin–Pątnów railway
CMC Centrozłom	Station siding	Konin railway station
Gosławice Sugar Factory (dismantled)	Station siding	Konin railway station
Konin Power Plant (now Lafarge Cement Polska)	Track siding	Konin–Pątnów railway
Pątnów Power Plant	Track siding	Konin–Pątnów railway
Open-Pit Mining Equipment Factory	Track siding	Konin–Pątnów railway
Konin Aluminium Smelter	Station siding	Konin railway station
Konin Construction Company (now Kon-Bet)	Station siding	Konin railway station
State Grain Enterprises (now Exspress Polska)	Station siding	Konin railway station
Poznań Building Materials Agency	Station siding	Konin railway station
Torpol	Station siding	Konin railway station
Provincial Heat and Gas Company Energogaz (now POL-DRÓG)	Track siding	Konin–Pątnów railway

== Konin Coal Mine Mining Railways ==
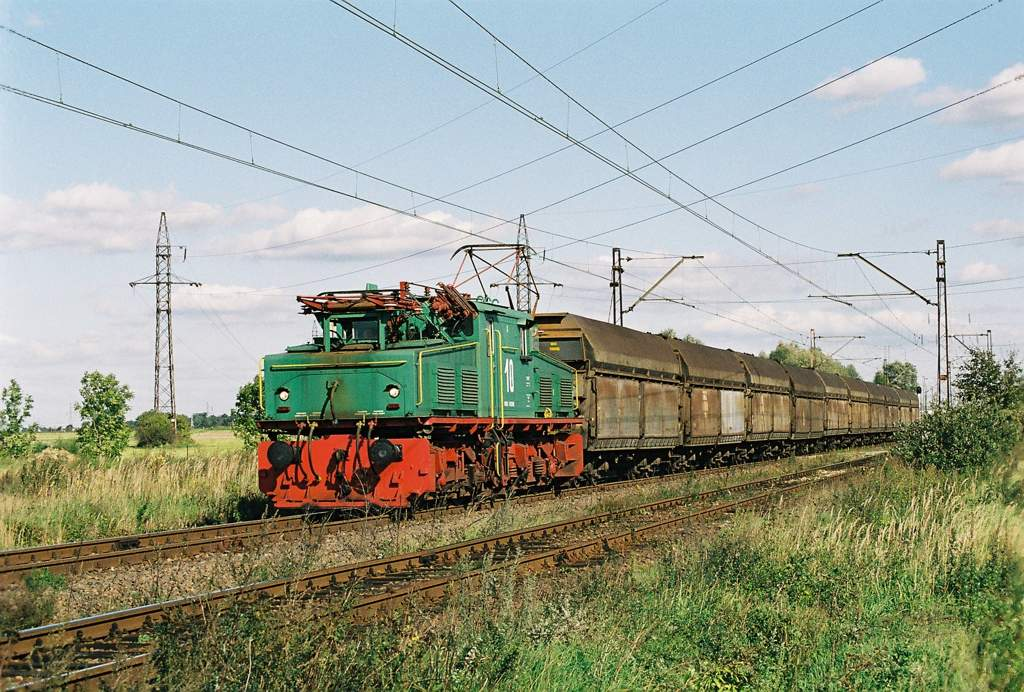
LEW EL2 near Pątnów Power Plant

In Konin and the Konin County, a railway siding is operated by Konin Coal Mine Mining Railways. These railways transport lignite from the mine's open-pit mines to the Pątnów and Konin power plants. Trains, consisting of an LEW EL2 electric locomotive and 10 self-unloading wagons, operate on a 100 km network in a shuttle system. In 2000, a unique push-pull operation was introduced by the Ministry of Transport and Maritime Economy for sections where turning or changing the train's direction is not feasible.

Initially, coal was transported using a chain railway with a 500 mm gauge and a collision-free cable cars along present-day Wyspiański Street, built by German occupiers during World War II. Until 1954, the 1,381.76 m aerial railway delivered coal from the Morzysław open-pit mine to a briquette plant operating from 1946 to 1994. The aerial railway was dismantled in the late 1950s. Narrow-gauge trains, initially steam and diesel-powered, later electric, were used to transport overburden and coal. From 1960, the Pątnów open-pit mine used standard-gauge rolling stock, operated by EL2 locomotives, for overburden and, from 1962, coal transport. In 1963, due to challenges with temporary tracks at the Kazimierz open-pit mine, rail transport for overburden was replaced by a K–T–Z system (excavator–conveyor belt–stacker). Since then, coal has been transported to loading stations via conveyor belts and loaded onto trains for delivery to power plants.
