= Malkinia =

Malkinia may refer to:

- Malkinia, a name for a genus of Aradidae
- Malkinia, a deprecated name for Microcentrum, a genus of bush crickets or katydids
- Three villages in Poland, located in Małkinia Górna Commune (Gmina Małkinia Górna):
  - Małkinia Dolna
  - Małkinia Górna
  - Małkinia Mała-Przewóz
