= Borowe =

Borowe may refer to:

- Borowe, Gmina Mogielnica in Masovian Voivodeship (east-central Poland)
- Borowe, Gmina Warka in Masovian Voivodeship (east-central Poland)
- Borowe, Podlaskie Voivodeship (north-east Poland)
- Borowe, Mława County in Masovian Voivodeship (east-central Poland)
- Borowe, Gmina Małkinia Górna, Ostrów County in Masovian Voivodeship (east-central Poland)
- Borowe, Greater Poland Voivodeship (west-central Poland)
- Borowe, Silesian Voivodeship (south Poland)
- Borowe, Lubusz Voivodeship (west Poland)
- Borowe, Warmian-Masurian Voivodeship (north Poland)
