= Mokra =

Mokra may refer to the following places:

- Mokra, Łódź Voivodeship (central Poland)
- Mokra, Silesian Voivodeship (south Poland)
- Mokra, Świętokrzyskie Voivodeship (south-central Poland)
- Mokra, Greater Poland Voivodeship (west-central Poland)
- Mokra, Lubusz Voivodeship (west Poland)
- Mokra, Opole Voivodeship (south-west Poland)
- Mokra, Serbia, a village in the municipality of Bela Palanka, Pirot District, Serbia
- Mokra, Estonia, a village in Misso Parish, Võru County, Estonia
- Mokra, Albania, a region in Albania
- Mokra, Montenegro, a mountain in Montenegro
- Mokra, North Macedonia (Jakupica), a mountain range in the central part of North Macedonia
- Mokra, Polish name for Mocra, a village in Transnistria, Moldova

Mokra may also refer to:

- Mokra, an antagonistic alien race in Resistance (Star Trek: Voyager)

== See also ==
- Mokra Mountain (disambiguation)
- Mokra Gora, a village in the municipality of Užice, Zlatibor District, Serbia
- Mokra Gora (mountain), a mountain in Kosovo, Montenegro and Serbia
