= Daniłówka =

Daniłówka may refer to the following places in Poland:

- Daniłówka Druga
- Daniłówka Pierwsza
