= Grądy, Gmina Małkinia Górna =

Grądy
- Village
- Location within Poland
- Coordinates: 52°38′34″N 22°1′21″E
- Country: Poland
- Voivodeship: Masovian
- County: Ostrów
- Gmina: Małkinia Górna

Grądy [ˈɡrɔndɨ] is a village in the administrative district of Gmina Małkinia Górna in Ostrów County, Masovian Voivodeship, in east-central Poland. It is approximately 7 km (4 mi) south of Małkinia Górna, 20 km (12 mi) southeast of Ostrów Mazowiecka, and 84 km (52 mi) northeast of Warsaw.
