= Olesin =

Olesin may refer to the following places:

- Olesin, Krasnystaw County in Lublin Voivodeship (east Poland)
- Olesin, Puławy County in Lublin Voivodeship (east Poland)
- Olesin, Masovian Voivodeship (east-central Poland)
- Olesin, Konin County in Greater Poland Voivodeship (west-central Poland)
- Olesin, Szamotuły County in Greater Poland Voivodeship (west-central Poland)
- Olesin, Turek County in Greater Poland Voivodeship (west-central Poland)
