= Anielewo =

Anielewo may refer to the following places:

- Anielewo, Konin County in Greater Poland Voivodeship (west-central Poland)
- Anielewo, Słupca County in Greater Poland Voivodeship (west-central Poland)
- Anielewo, Kuyavian-Pomeranian Voivodeship (north-central Poland)
