= Warznia =

- Settlement
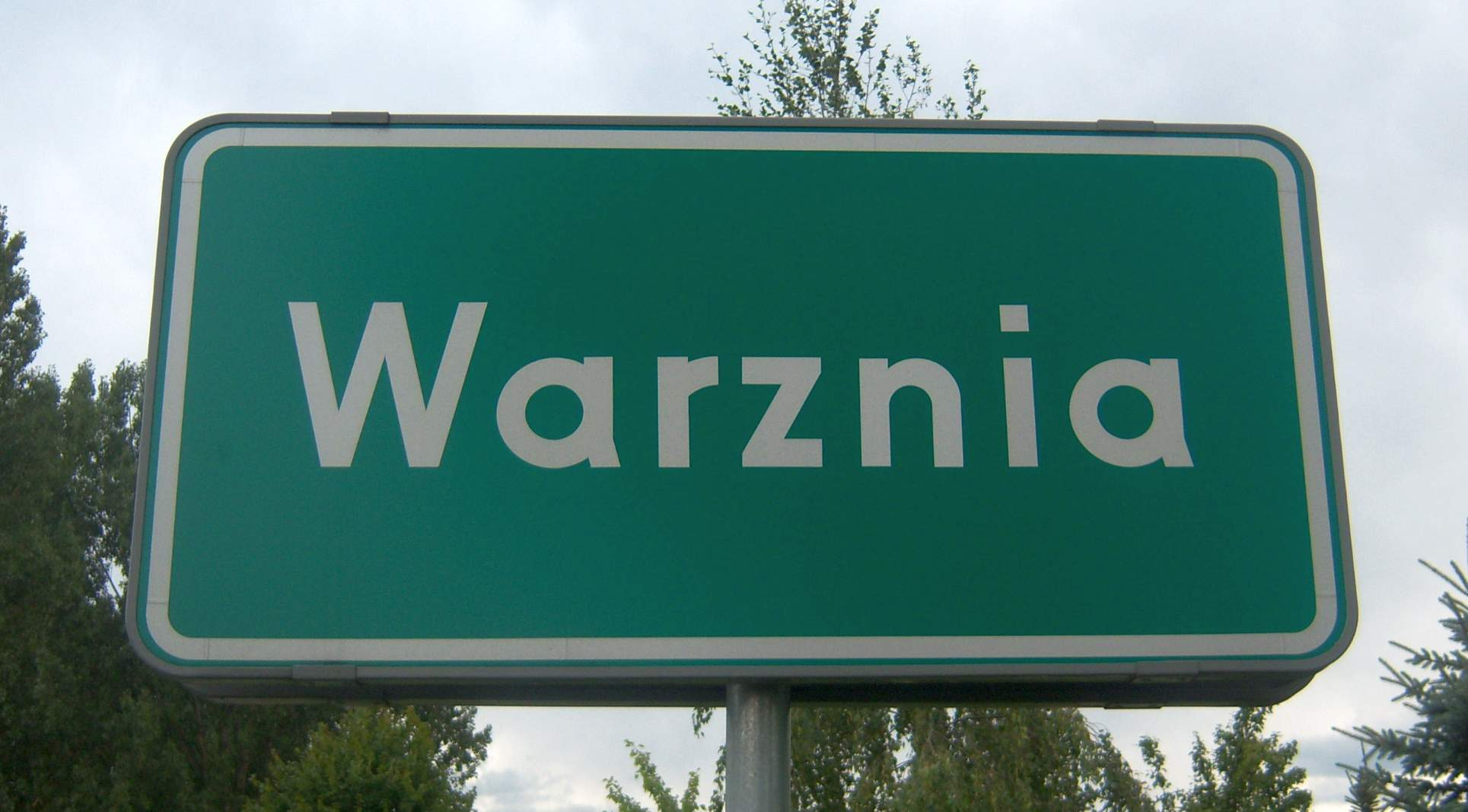

- Location within Poland
- Coordinates: 52°18′45″N 18°07′07″E
- Country: Poland
- Voivodeship: Greater Poland
- County: Konin
- Gmina: Kazimierz Biskupi
- Population: 24

Warznia [ˈvaʐɲa] is a settlement in the administrative district of Gmina Kazimierz Biskupi, within Konin County, Greater Poland Voivodeship, in west-central Poland. Warznia is part of the sołectwo (administrative village unit) of Nieświastów within the Gmina Kazimierz Biskupi. The sołectwo functions as a local self-governing body representing the settlement and surrounding areas. As of the current term, the head (sołtys) of Nieświastów is Beata Staszak, who serves as a liaison between residents and the municipal authorities. Historically, Warznia has been a small rural settlement with a primarily agricultural character, comprising several farmsteads.
