= Klukowo =

Klukowo may refer to the following places:

- Klukowo, Gmina Małkinia Górna, Ostrów County in Masovian Voivodeship (east-central Poland)
- Klukowo, Siemiatycze County in Podlaskie Voivodeship (north-east Poland)
- Klukowo, Wysokie Mazowieckie County in Podlaskie Voivodeship (north-east Poland)
- Klukowo, Pułtusk County in Masovian Voivodeship (east-central Poland)
- Klukowo, Greater Poland Voivodeship (west-central Poland)
