= Cząstków, Konin County =

Cząstków
- Village
- Location within Poland
- Coordinates: 52°19′N 18°3′E
- Country: Poland
- Voivodeship: Greater Poland
- County: Konin
- Gmina: Kazimierz Biskupi

Cząstków [ˈt͡ʂɔ̃stkuf] is a village in the administrative district of Gmina Kazimierz Biskupi, within Konin County, Greater Poland Voivodeship, in west-central Poland.
