= Kańkowo =

- Village
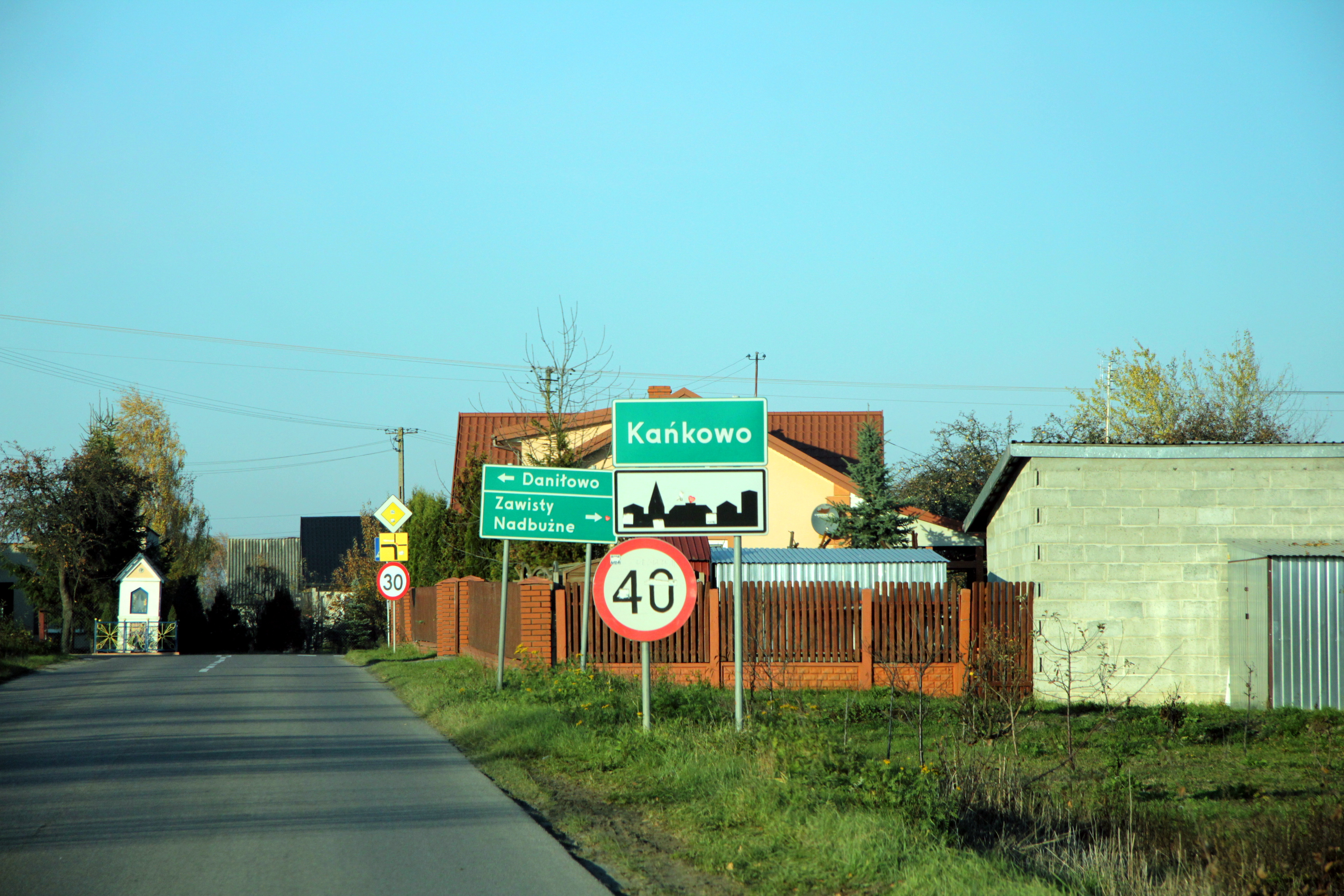

- Location within Poland
- Coordinates: 52°43′N 22°3′E
- Country: Poland
- Voivodeship: Masovian
- County: Ostrów
- Gmina: Małkinia Górna

Kańkowo [kaɲˈkɔvɔ] is a village in the administrative district of Gmina Małkinia Górna, within Ostrów County, Masovian Voivodeship, in east-central Poland.
