= Dębówka, Greater Poland Voivodeship =

Dębówka
- Village
- Location within Poland
- Coordinates: 52°17′51″N 18°5′7″E
- Country: Poland
- Voivodeship: Greater Poland
- County: Konin
- Gmina: Kazimierz Biskupi
- Population: 50

Dębówka [dɛmˈbufka] is a village in the administrative district of Gmina Kazimierz Biskupi, within Konin County, Greater Poland Voivodeship, in west-central Poland.
