= Sumiężne =

- Village
- Location within Poland
- Coordinates: 52°42′N 21°58′E
- Country: Poland
- Voivodeship: Masovian
- County: Ostrów
- Gmina: Małkinia Górna

Sumiężne [suˈmjɛ̃ʐnɛ] is a village in the administrative district of Gmina Małkinia Górna, within Ostrów County, Masovian Voivodeship, in east-central Poland.
