= Radwaniec =

- Village
- Location within Poland
- Coordinates: 52°18′N 18°5′E
- Country: Poland
- Voivodeship: Greater Poland
- County: Konin
- Gmina: Kazimierz Biskupi

Radwaniec (Polish pronunciation: [raˈdvaɲɛt͡s]) is a village in the administrative district of Gmina Kazimierz Biskupi, within Konin County, Greater Poland Voivodeship, in west-central Poland.
