= Wola Łaszczowa =

- Village
- Location within Poland
- Coordinates: 52°16′N 18°14′E
- Country: Poland
- Voivodeship: Greater Poland
- County: Konin
- Gmina: Kazimierz Biskupi

Wola Łaszczowa [ˈvɔla waʂˈt͡ʂɔva] is a village in the administrative district of Gmina Kazimierz Biskupi, within Konin County, Greater Poland Voivodeship, in west-central Poland.
