= Ludwików, Konin County =

Ludwików
- Settlement
- Location within Poland
- Coordinates: 52°17′12″N 18°13′25″E
- Country: Poland
- Voivodeship: Greater Poland
- County: Konin
- Gmina: Kazimierz Biskupi

Ludwików [ludˈvikuf] is a settlement in the administrative district of Gmina Kazimierz Biskupi, within Konin County, Greater Poland Voivodeship, in west-central Poland.
