= Kamienica-Majątek =

- Settlement
- Location within Poland
- Coordinates: 52°19′13″N 18°13′31″E
- Country: Poland
- Voivodeship: Greater Poland
- County: Konin
- Gmina: Kazimierz Biskupi

Kamienica-Majątek [kamjɛˈnit͡sa maˈjɔntɛk] is a settlement in the administrative district of Gmina Kazimierz Biskupi, within Konin County, Greater Poland Voivodeship, in west-central Poland.
