= Orło, Masovian Voivodeship =

Orło
- Village
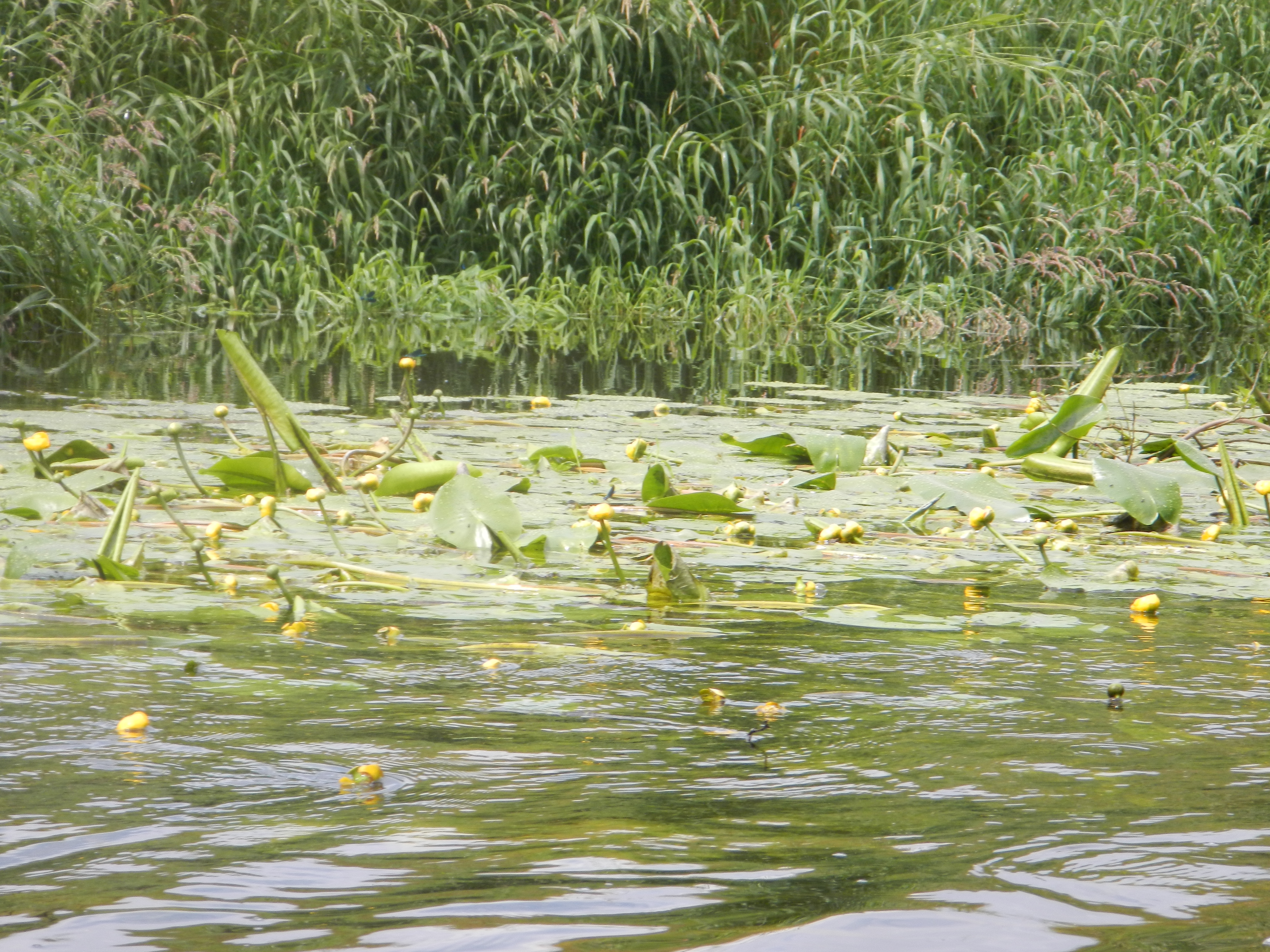
- Brok river in Orło

- Location within Poland
- Coordinates: 52°45′N 21°59′E
- Country: Poland
- Voivodeship: Masovian
- County: Ostrów
- Gmina: Małkinia Górna
- Vehicle registration: WOR

Orło [ˈɔrwɔ] is a village in the administrative district of Gmina Małkinia Górna, within Ostrów County, Masovian Voivodeship, in east-central Poland.

== History ==
Orło was a private church village of the Roman Catholic Diocese of Płock, administratively located in the Masovian Voivodeship in the Greater Poland Province of the Kingdom of Poland.

In 1823, the village had a population of 33.

During the German invasion of Poland which started World War II, on September 9, 1939, German troops carried out a massacre of 10 Poles (see Nazi crimes against the Polish nation).
