= Posada, Gmina Kazimierz Biskupi =

Posada
- Village
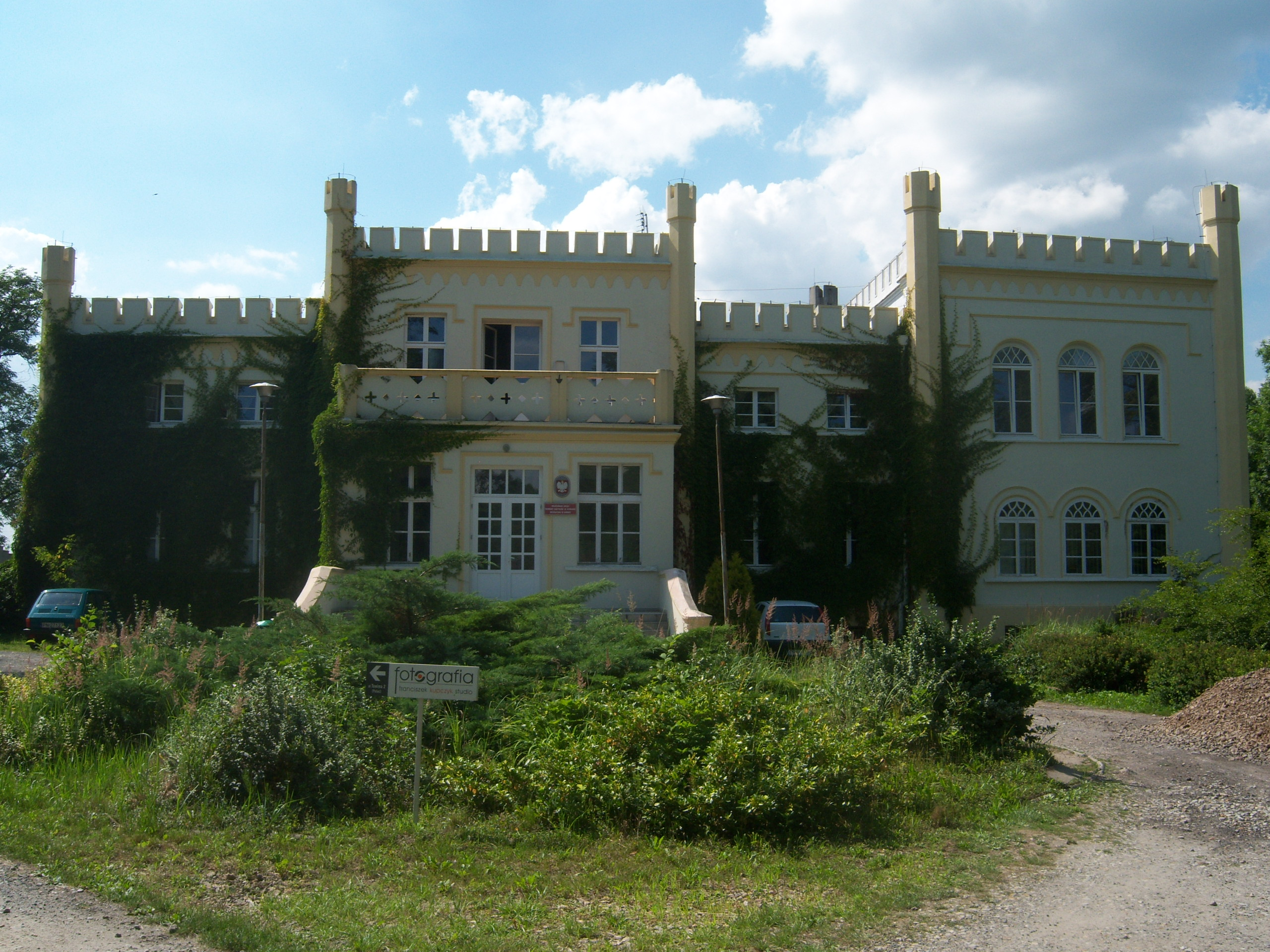
- Kowalski's Palace in Posada, Gmina Kazimierz Biskupi

- Location within Poland
- Coordinates: 52°15′19″N 18°13′49″E
- Country: Poland
- Voivodeship: Greater Poland
- County: Konin
- Gmina: Kazimierz Biskupi

Posada [pɔˈsada] is a village in the administrative district of Gmina Kazimierz Biskupi, within Konin County, Greater Poland Voivodeship, in west-central Poland.
