= Poniatowo, Gmina Małkinia Górna =

Poniatowo
- Village
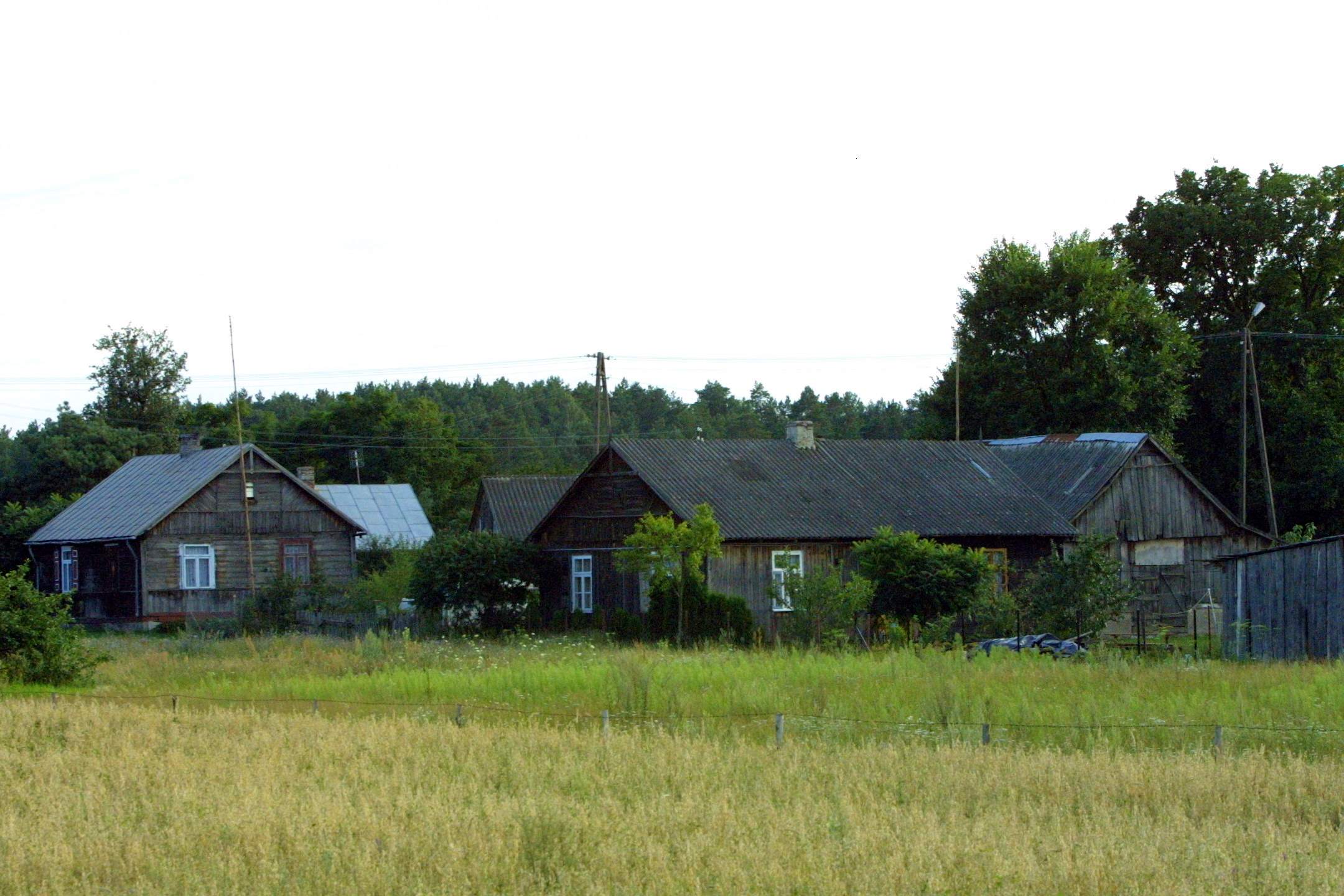
- Old farm at Poniatowo

- Location within Poland
- Coordinates: 52°38′30″N 22°02′15″E
- Country: Poland
- Voivodeship: Masovian
- County: Ostrów
- Gmina: Małkinia Górna
- Time zone: UTC+1 (CET)
  - Summer (DST): UTC+2 (CEST)
- Vehicle registration: WOR

Poniatowo [pɔɲaˈtɔvɔ] is a village in the administrative district of Gmina Małkinia Górna, within Ostrów County, Masovian Voivodeship, in east-central Poland.
