= Komorowo-Kolonia =

- Settlement
- Location within Poland
- Coordinates: 52°20′N 18°6′E
- Country: Poland
- Voivodeship: Greater Poland
- County: Konin
- Gmina: Kazimierz Biskupi

Komorowo-Kolonia [kɔmɔˈrɔvɔ kɔˈlɔɲa] is a settlement in the administrative district of Gmina Kazimierz Biskupi, within Konin County, Greater Poland Voivodeship, in west-central Poland.
