= Kamienica, Konin County =

Kamienica
- Village
- Location within Poland
- Coordinates: 52°19′22″N 18°13′41″E
- Country: Poland
- Voivodeship: Greater Poland
- County: Konin
- Gmina: Kazimierz Biskupi

Kamienica [kamjɛˈnit͡sa] is a village in the administrative district of Gmina Kazimierz Biskupi, within Konin County, Greater Poland Voivodeship, in west-central Poland.
