= Wierzchy, Konin County =

Wierzchy
- Settlement
- Location within Poland
- Coordinates: 52°19′36″N 18°02′52″E
- Country: Poland
- Voivodeship: Greater Poland
- County: Konin
- Gmina: Kazimierz Biskupi

Wierzchy [ˈvjɛʂxɨ] is a settlement in the administrative district of Gmina Kazimierz Biskupi, within Konin County, Greater Poland Voivodeship, in west-central Poland.
