= Konin railway station =

Railway station in Konin, Poland

Konin
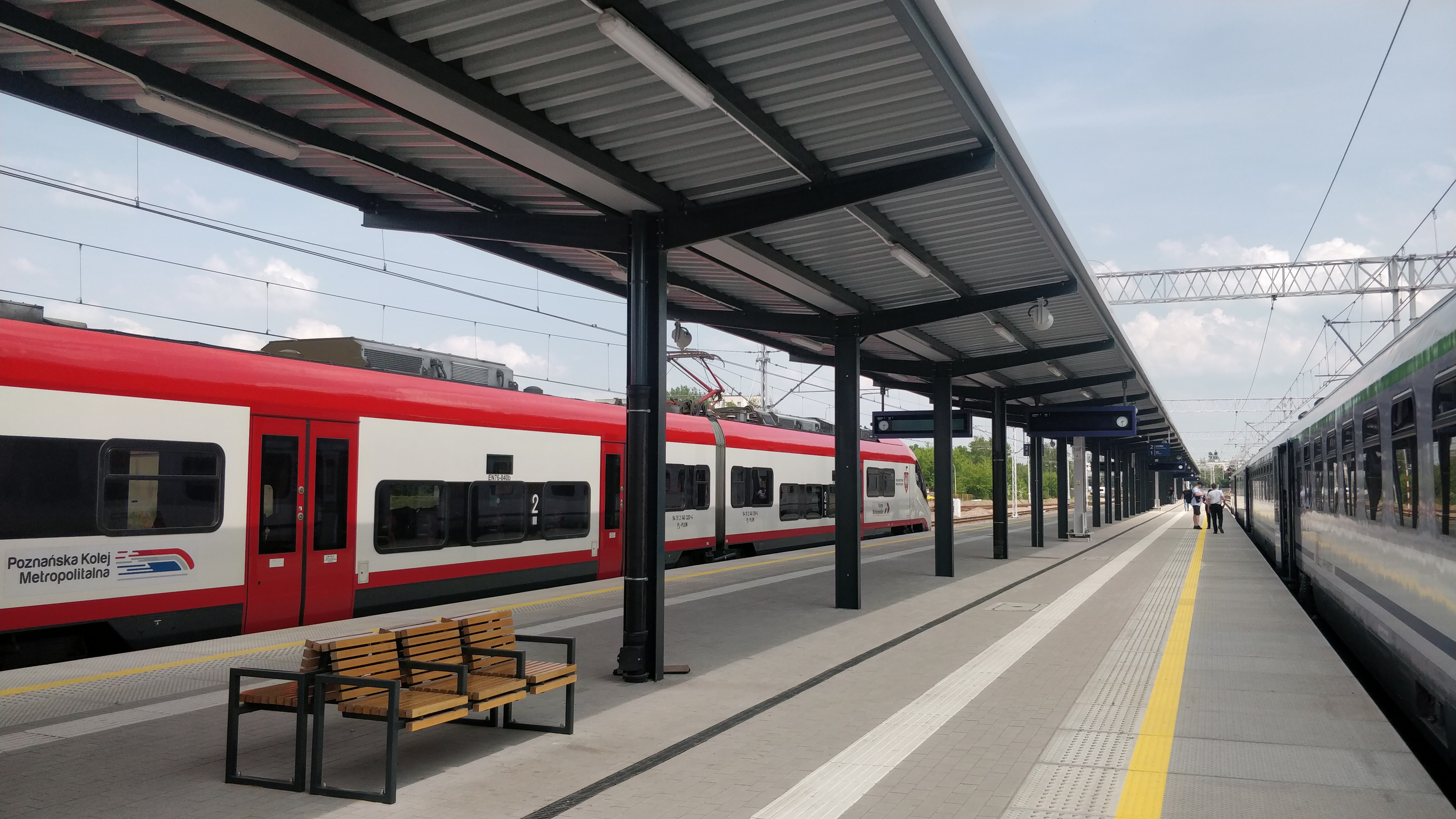
- Konin railway station

General information
- Location: 1 Kolejowa, Konin, Greater Poland Voivodeship; Poland
- Coordinates: 52°13′53″N 18°15′06″E
- System: Railway Station
- Operator: PKP; Greater Poland Railways
- Lines: 3: Warsaw–Kunowice railway 388: Konin–Pątnów railway
- Platforms: 3

History
- Opened: 1921; 105 years ago
- Electrified: 1962

Services
Preceding station	PKP Intercity	Following station
Poznań Główny towards Berlin Hbf	EuroCity EC 95; EIC	Kutno towards Warszawa Wschodnia
Poznań Główny towards Köln Hbf	EuroNight	Kutno towards Warszawa Wschodnia
Poznań Główny towards Szczecin Główny	EIC	Kutno towards Warszawa Wschodnia
Preceding station	KW	Following station
Konin Zachód towards Poznań Główny	Poznań - Kutno	Kramsk towards Kutno
Location
- Location within Poland Location within Greater Poland Voivodeship

Konin railway station is a railway station in Konin, in the Greater Poland Voivodeship, Poland and is part of the rail transport in Konin system. The station opened in 1921 and is located on the Warsaw–Kunowice railway and Konin–Kazimierz Biskupi railway. The train services are operated by PKP and Greater Poland Railways.

The original station building, designed by Romuald Miller, was a two-wing construction modelled on a Polish gentry house. Miller designed similar buildings for Koło and Gdynia Główna (also demolished). The station building was replaced in 1977–1978.

Passenger trains on the line to Kazimierz Biskupi ceased in May 1996.

== Train services ==
The station is served by the following service(s):

- EuroCity services (EC) (EC 95 by DB) (EIC by PKP) Berlin - Frankfurt (Oder) - Rzepin - Poznan - Kutno - Warsaw
- EuroNight services (EN) Cologne - Duisburg - Dortmund - Berlin - Frankfurt (Oder) - Poznan - Kutno - Warsaw
- Express Intercity services (EIC) Szczecin — Warsaw
- Intercity services Szczecin - Stargard - Krzyz - Poznan - Kutno - Warsaw - Lublin - Przemysl
- Intercity services Szczecin - Stargard - Krzyz - Poznan - Kutno - Warsaw - Bialystok
- Intercity services Zielona Gora - Zbaszynek - Poznan - Kutno - Warsaw
- Intercity services Wroclaw - Ostrow Wielkopolskie - Jarocin - Poznan - Kutno - Warsaw
- Intercity services Szczecin - Stargard - Krzyz - Poznan - Kutno - Lowicz - Lodz - Krakow
- Intercity services Bydgoszcz - Gniezno - Poznan - Kutno - Lowicz - Lodz - Krakow
- Regional services (KW) Poznan - Wrzesnia - Konin - Kutno
