= Przewóz, Gmina Małkinia Górna =

Przewóz
- Village
- Location within Poland
- Coordinates: 52°41′3″N 22°1′3″E
- Country: Poland
- Voivodeship: Masovian
- County: Ostrów
- Gmina: Małkinia Górna
- Population: 300

Przewóz [ˈpʂɛvus] is a village in the administrative district of Gmina Małkinia Górna, within Ostrów County, Masovian Voivodeship, in east-central Poland.
