= Zawisty Podleśne =

- Village
- Location within Poland
- Coordinates: 52°43′N 22°5′E
- Country: Poland
- Voivodeship: Masovian
- County: Ostrów
- Gmina: Małkinia Górna

Zawisty Podleśne [zaˈvistɨ pɔdˈlɛɕnɛ] is a village in the administrative district of Gmina Małkinia Górna, within Ostrów County, Masovian Voivodeship, in east-central Poland.
