= Rostki-Piotrowice =

- Village
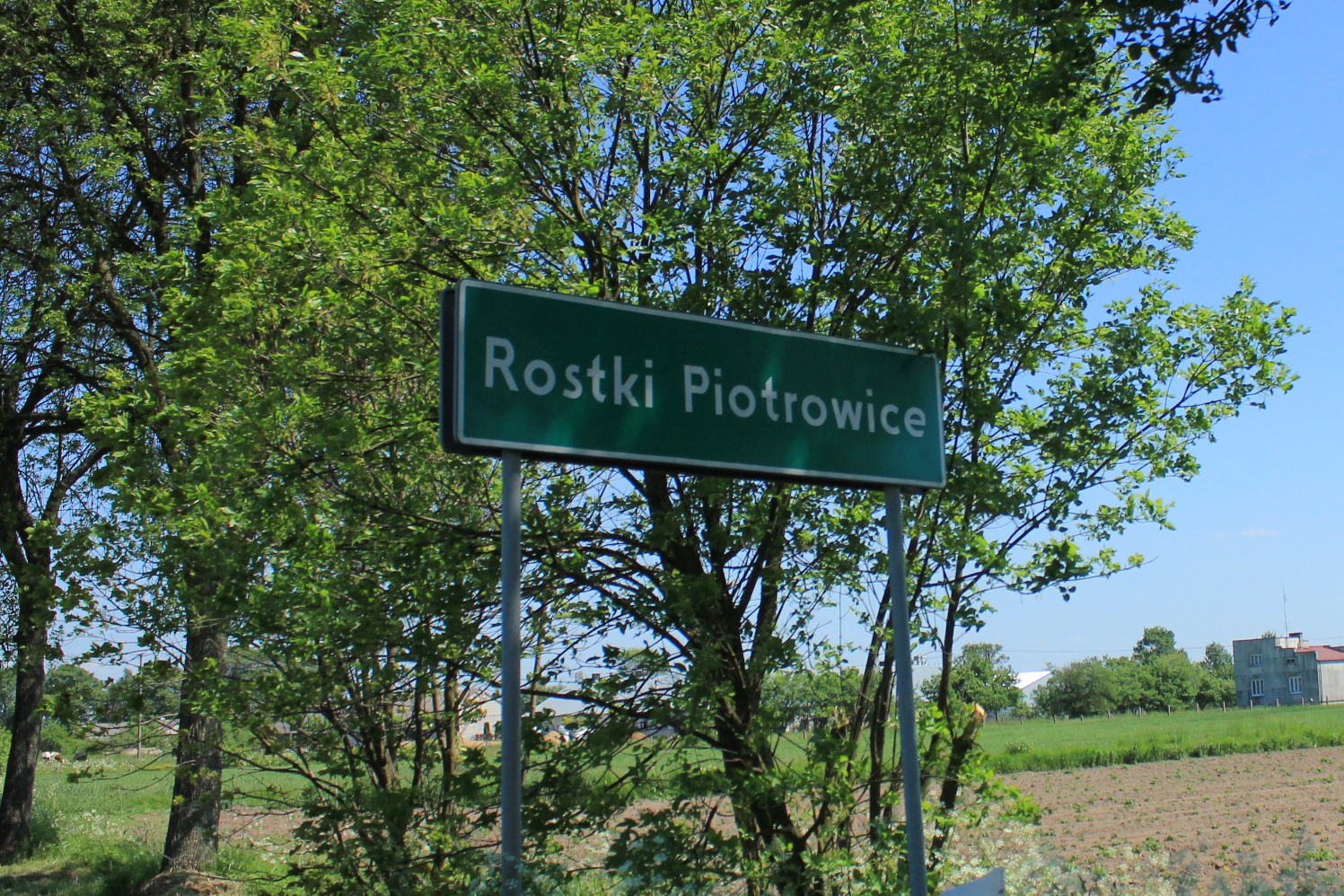
- Road sign in Rostki-Piotrowice

- Location within Poland
- Coordinates: 52°41′46″N 22°05′29″E
- Country: Poland
- Voivodeship: Masovian
- County: Ostrów
- Gmina: Małkinia Górna

Rostki-Piotrowice [ˈrɔstki pjɔtrɔˈvit͡sɛ] is a village in the administrative district of Gmina Małkinia Górna, within Ostrów County, Masovian Voivodeship, in east-central Poland.
