= Boreczek, Masovian Voivodeship =

Boreczek
- Village
- Location within Poland
- Coordinates: 52°40′19″N 22°2′8″E
- Country: Poland
- Voivodeship: Masovian
- County: Ostrów
- Gmina: Małkinia Górna

Boreczek [bɔˈrɛt͡ʂɛk] is a village in the administrative district of Gmina Małkinia Górna, within Ostrów County, Masovian Voivodeship, in east-central Poland.
