= Glina, Gmina Małkinia Górna =

Glina
- Village
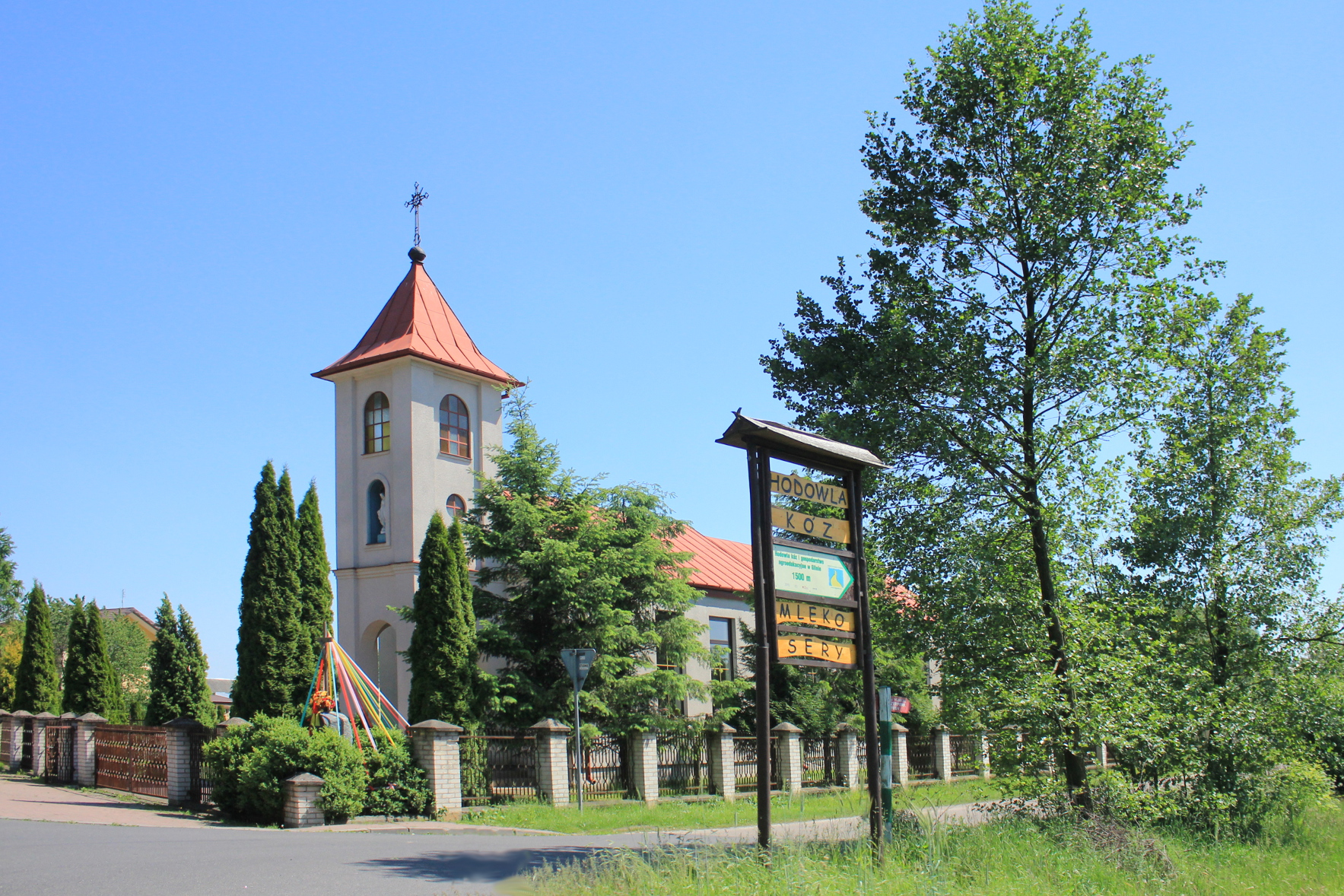
- Chapel in the village

- Location within Poland
- Coordinates: 52°41′49″N 21°57′31″E
- Country: Poland
- Voivodeship: Masovian
- County: Ostrów
- Gmina: Małkinia Górna

Glina [ˈɡlina] is a village in the administrative district of Gmina Małkinia Górna, within Ostrów County, Masovian Voivodeship, in east-central Poland.
