= Podgórze-Gazdy =

- Village
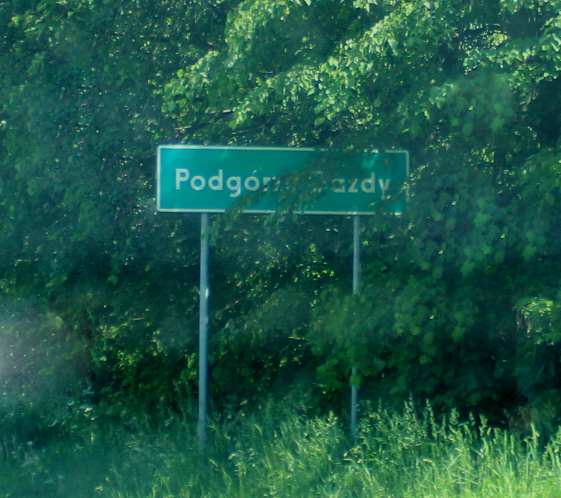

- Location within Poland
- Coordinates: 52°41′52″N 22°07′48″E
- Country: Poland
- Voivodeship: Masovian
- County: Ostrów
- Gmina: Małkinia Górna

Podgórze-Gazdy [pɔdˈɡuʐɛ ˈɡazdɨ] is a village in the administrative district of Gmina Małkinia Górna, within Ostrów County, Masovian Voivodeship, in east-central Poland.
