= Bielawy, Konin County =

Bielawy
- Village
- Location within Poland
- Coordinates: 52°15′56″N 18°11′33″E
- Country: Poland
- Voivodeship: Greater Poland
- County: Konin
- Gmina: Kazimierz Biskupi
- Population: 200

Bielawy [bjɛˈlavɨ] is a village in the administrative district of Gmina Kazimierz Biskupi, within Konin County, Greater Poland Voivodeship, in west-central Poland.
