= Komorowo, Konin County =

Komorowo
- Village
- Location within Poland
- Coordinates: 52°20′17″N 18°05′58″E
- Country: Poland
- Voivodeship: Greater Poland
- County: Konin
- Gmina: Kazimierz Biskupi

Komorowo [kɔmɔˈrɔvɔ] is a village in the administrative district of Gmina Kazimierz Biskupi, within Konin County, Greater Poland Voivodeship, in west-central Poland.
