= Wygoda, Gmina Kazimierz Biskupi =

Wygoda
- Settlement
- Location within Poland
- Coordinates: 52°21′42″N 18°10′21″E
- Country: Poland
- Voivodeship: Greater Poland
- County: Konin
- Gmina: Kazimierz Biskupi

Wygoda [vɨˈɡɔda] is a settlement in the administrative district of Gmina Kazimierz Biskupi, within Konin County, Greater Poland Voivodeship, in west-central Poland.
