= Dobrosołowo =

- Village
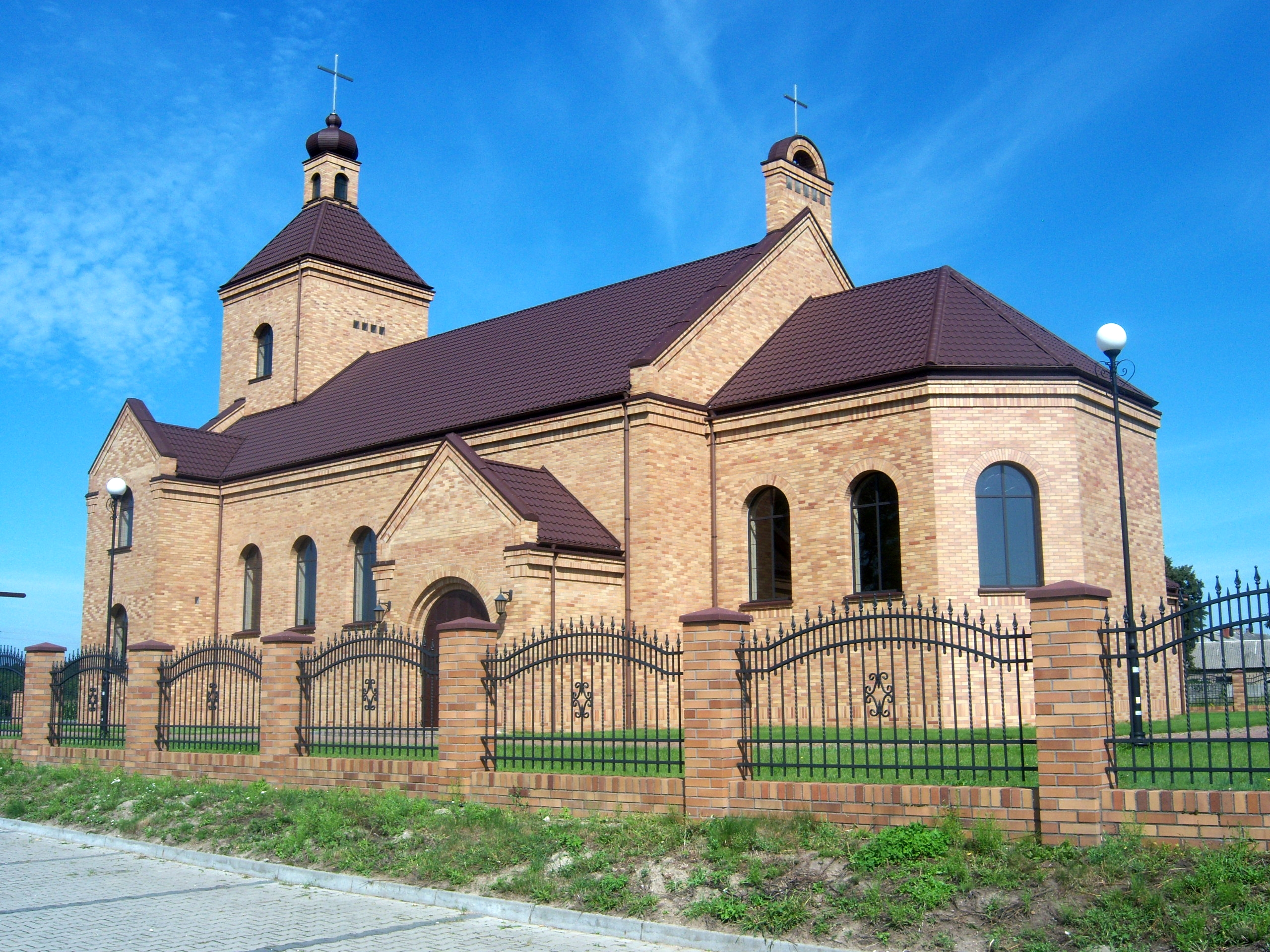
- St. James Apostle's Church

- Location within Poland
- Coordinates: 52°21′N 18°5′E
- Country: Poland
- Voivodeship: Greater Poland
- County: Konin
- Gmina: Kazimierz Biskupi

Dobrosołowo [dɔbrɔsɔˈwɔvɔ] is a village in the administrative district of Gmina Kazimierz Biskupi, within Konin County, Greater Poland Voivodeship, in west-central Poland.
