= Włodzimirów, Konin County =

Włodzimirów
- Village
- Location within Poland
- Coordinates: 52°16′43″N 18°13′1″E
- Country: Poland
- Voivodeship: Greater Poland
- County: Konin
- Gmina: Kazimierz Biskupi
- Population: 230

Włodzimirów [vwɔd͡ʑiˈmiruf] is a village in the administrative district of Gmina Kazimierz Biskupi, within Konin County, Greater Poland Voivodeship, in west-central Poland.
