= Daniłowo-Parcele =

Village in Gmina Małkinia Górna, Poland

- Village
- Location within Poland
- Coordinates: 52°45′36″N 22°00′46″E
- Country: Poland
- Voivodeship: Masovian
- County: Ostrów
- Gmina: Małkinia Górna

Daniłowo-Parcele [daniˈwɔvɔ parˈt͡sɛlɛ] is a village in the administrative district of Gmina Małkinia Górna, within Ostrów County, Masovian Voivodeship, in east-central Poland.
