= Kiełczew =

- Village
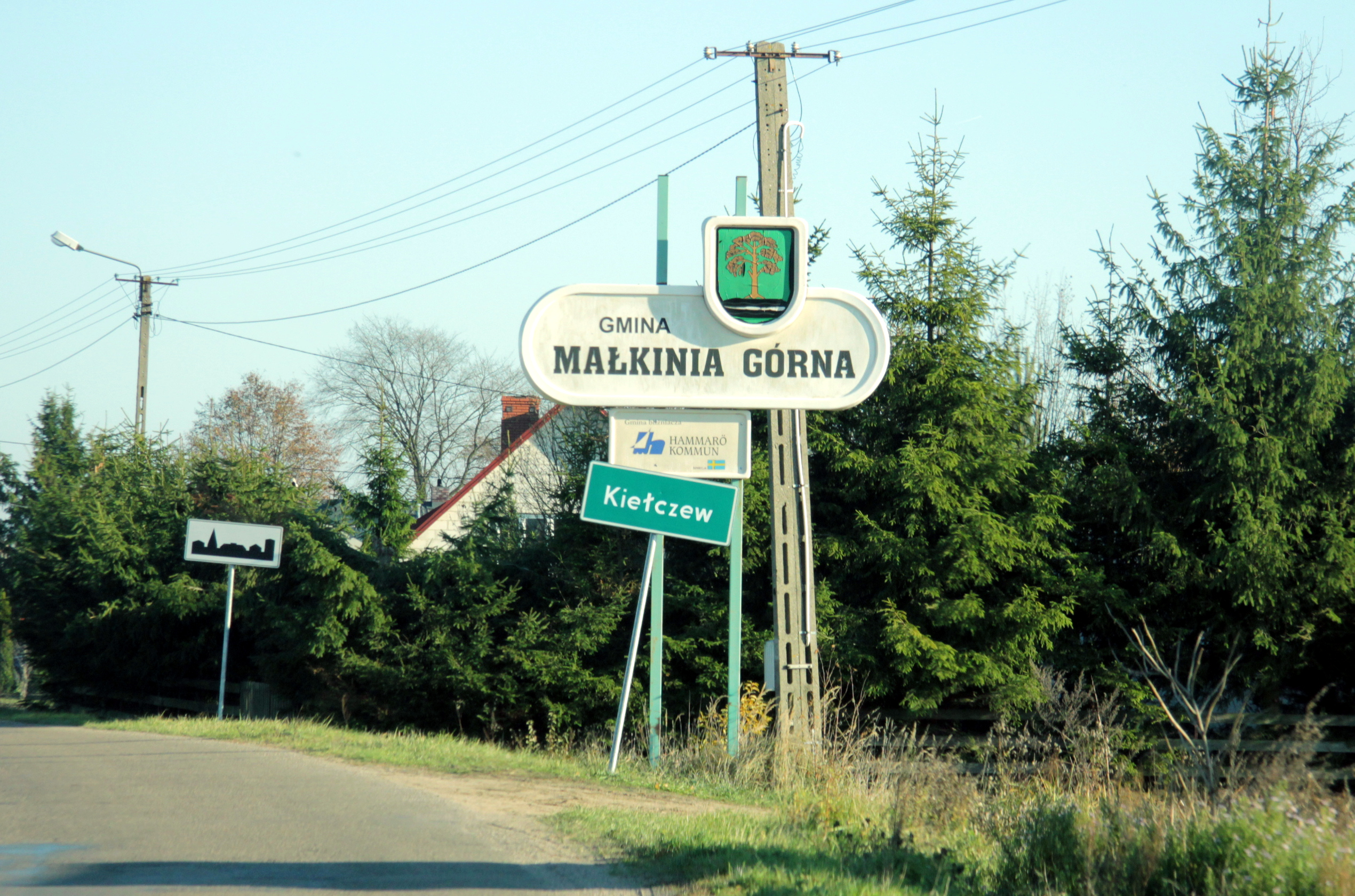

- Location within Poland
- Coordinates: 52°40′10″N 21°56′46″E
- Country: Poland
- Voivodeship: Masovian
- County: Ostrów
- Gmina: Małkinia Górna
- Population: 710

Kiełczew [ˈkʲɛu̯t͡ʂɛf] is a village in the administrative district of Gmina Małkinia Górna, within Ostrów County, Masovian Voivodeship, in east-central Poland.
