= Zawisty Nadbużne =

- Village
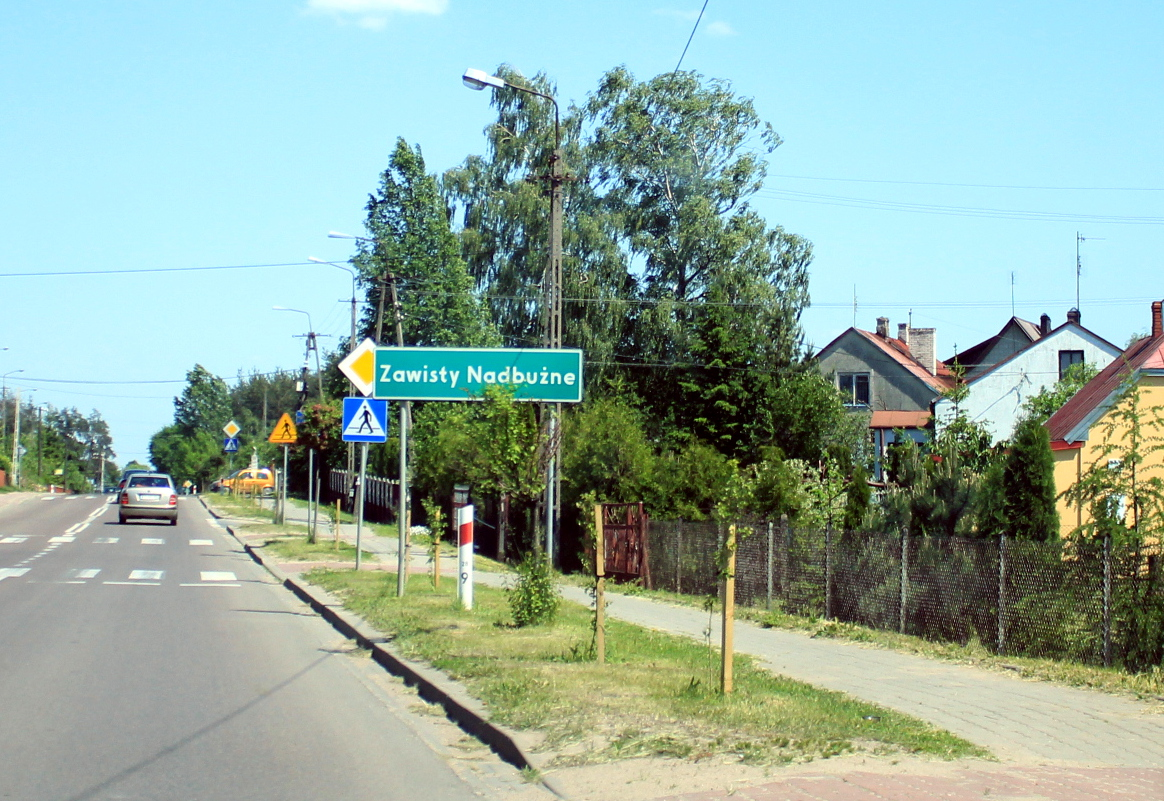

- Location within Poland
- Coordinates: 52°41′30″N 22°03′21″E
- Country: Poland
- Voivodeship: Masovian
- County: Ostrów
- Gmina: Małkinia Górna

Zawisty Nadbużne [zaˈvistɨ nadˈbuʐnɛ] is a village in the administrative district of Gmina Małkinia Górna, in Ostrów County, Masovian Voivodeship, in east-central Poland.
