= Dobrosołowo Drugie =

- Village
- Location within Poland
- Coordinates: 52°19′53″N 18°3′39″E
- Country: Poland
- Voivodeship: Greater Poland
- County: Konin
- Gmina: Kazimierz Biskupi

Dobrosołowo Drugie [dɔbrɔsɔˈwɔvɔ ˈdruɡʲɛ] is a village in the administrative district of Gmina Kazimierz Biskupi, within Konin County, Greater Poland Voivodeship, in west-central Poland.
