= Daniłowo, Gmina Małkinia Górna =

Daniłowo
- Village
- Location within Poland
- Coordinates: 52°45′N 22°2′E
- Country: Poland
- Voivodeship: Masovian
- County: Ostrów
- Gmina: Małkinia Górna

Daniłowo [daniˈwɔvɔ] is a village in the administrative district of Gmina Małkinia Górna, within Ostrów County, Masovian Voivodeship, in east-central Poland.
