= Prostyń =

- Village
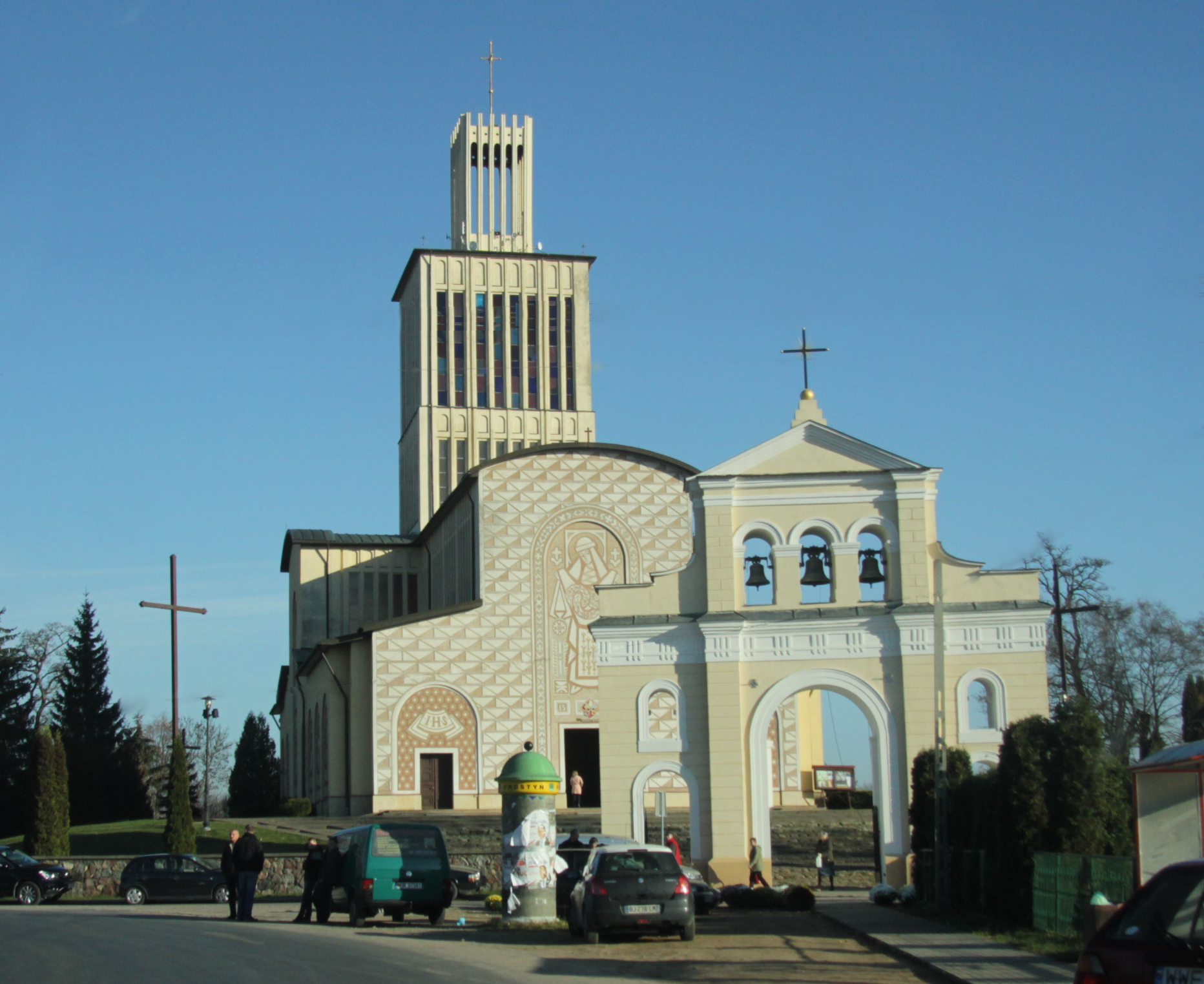
- Prostyń basilica

- Location within Poland
- Coordinates: 52°40′N 21°59′E
- Country: Poland
- Voivodeship: Masovian
- County: Ostrów
- Gmina: Małkinia Górna
- Population: 840

Prostyń [ˈprɔstɨɲ] is a village in the administrative district of Gmina Małkinia Górna, within Ostrów County, Masovian Voivodeship, in east-central Poland.
