= Marantów, Gmina Kazimierz Biskupi =

Marantów
- Settlement
- Location within Poland
- Coordinates: 52°17′08″N 18°12′26″E
- Country: Poland
- Voivodeship: Greater Poland
- County: Konin
- Gmina: Kazimierz Biskupi

Marantów [maˈrantuf] is a settlement in the administrative district of Gmina Kazimierz Biskupi, within Konin County, Greater Poland Voivodeship, in west-central Poland.
