= Żachy-Pawły =

- Village
- Location within Poland
- Coordinates: 52°45′N 21°59′E
- Country: Poland
- Voivodeship: Masovian
- County: Ostrów
- Gmina: Małkinia Górna

Żachy-Pawły [ˈʐaxɨ ˈpavwɨ] is a village in the administrative district of Gmina Małkinia Górna, within Ostrów County, Masovian Voivodeship, in east-central Poland.
