= Klukowo, Gmina Małkinia Górna =

Klukowo
- Village
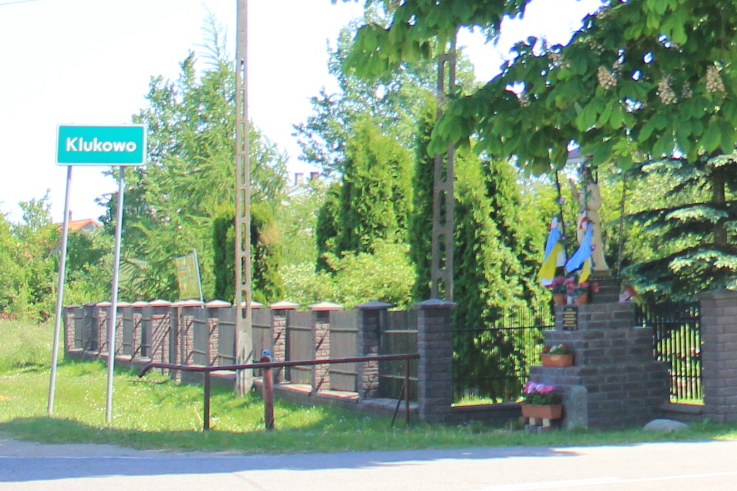
- Road sign in Klukowo

- Location within Poland
- Coordinates: 52°41′41″N 21°59′29″E
- Country: Poland
- Voivodeship: Masovian
- County: Ostrów
- Gmina: Małkinia Górna

Klukowo [kluˈkɔvɔ] is a village in the administrative district of Gmina Małkinia Górna, within Ostrów County, Masovian Voivodeship, in east-central Poland.
