= Mokra, Greater Poland Voivodeship =

Mokra
- Settlement
- Location within Poland
- Coordinates: 52°17′18″N 18°08′17″E
- Country: Poland
- Voivodeship: Greater Poland
- County: Konin
- Gmina: Kazimierz Biskupi

Mokra [ˈmɔkra] is a settlement in the administrative district of Gmina Kazimierz Biskupi, within Konin County, Greater Poland Voivodeship, in west-central Poland.

On 1 September 1939 the Wolynian Cavalry confronted the German 4th Panzer Division outside Mokra. The Germans managed to break through the Polish defences, but the Blitzkrieg was still at its infancy, and early Panzer divisions lacked the infantry necessary to properly overcome a prepared defence.
