= Nieświastów =

- Village
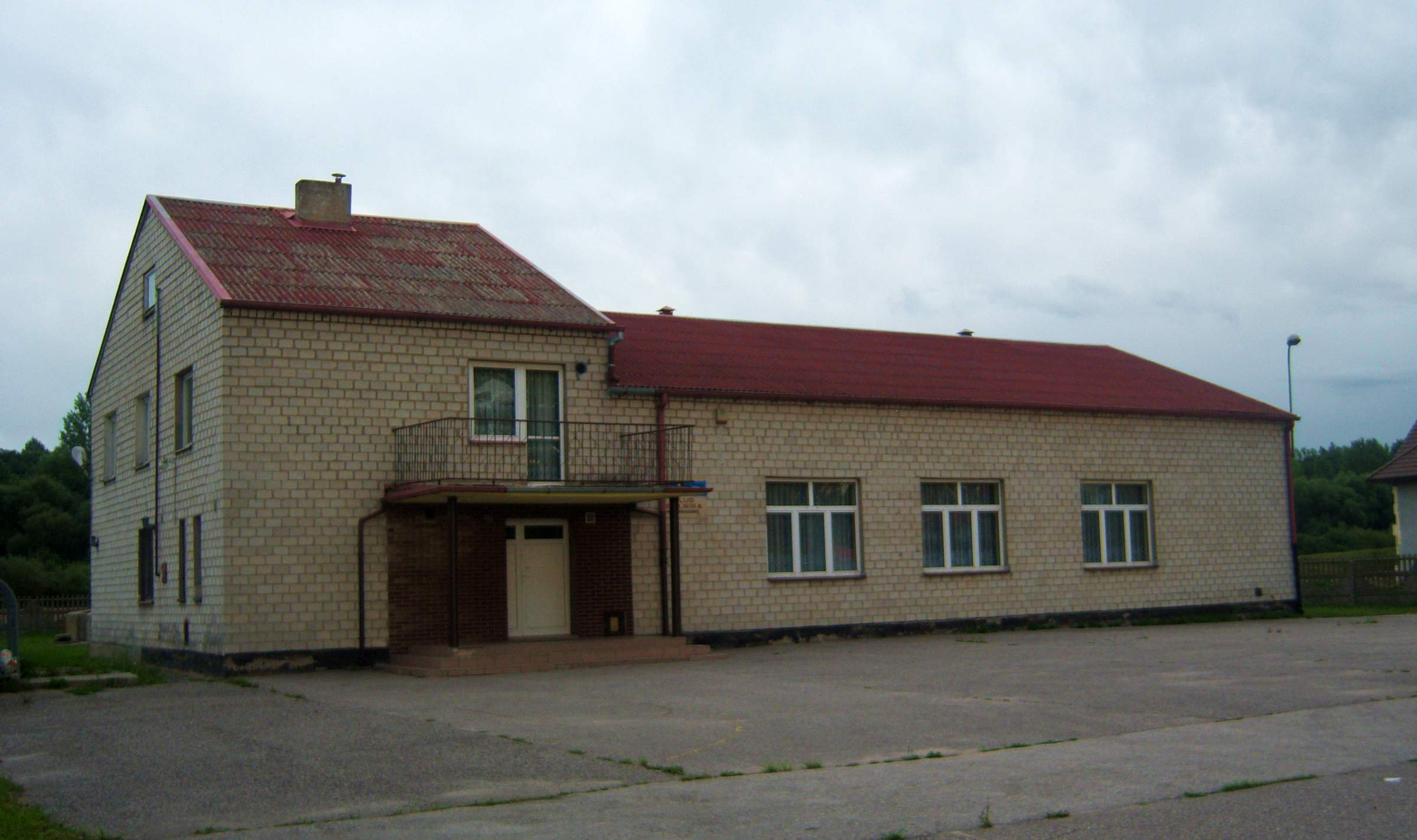
- Community centre in Nieświastów

- Location within Poland
- Coordinates: 52°20′N 18°8′E
- Country: Poland
- Voivodeship: Greater Poland
- County: Konin
- Gmina: Kazimierz Biskupi
- Population (2010): 577

Nieświastów [ɲɛɕˈfjastuf] is a village in the administrative district of Gmina Kazimierz Biskupi, within Konin County, Greater Poland Voivodeship, in west-central Poland.

In 2010 the village had a population of 577.
