= Olesin, Konin County =

Olesin
- Village
- Location within Poland
- Coordinates: 52°15′16″N 18°12′20″E
- Country: Poland
- Voivodeship: Greater Poland
- County: Konin
- Gmina: Kazimierz Biskupi
- Population: 20

Olesin [ɔˈlɛɕin] is a village in the administrative district of Gmina Kazimierz Biskupi, within Konin County, Greater Poland Voivodeship, in west-central Poland.
