= Gmina Małkinia Górna =

Gmina Małkinia Górna Małkinia Górna Commune
- Gmina
- Flag Coat of arms
- Interactive map of Gmina Małkinia Górna
- Coordinates (Małkinia Górna): 52°42′N 22°3′E
- Country: Poland
- Voivodeship: Masovian
- County: Ostrów
- Seat: Małkinia Górna

Area
  - Total: 134.08 km^{2} (51.77 sq mi)

Population (2013)
  - Total: 12,048
  - Density: 89.857/km^{2} (232.73/sq mi)
- Website: http://www.malkiniagorna.pl

Gmina Małkinia Górna is an urban-rural gmina (administrative district) in Ostrów County, Masovian Voivodeship, in east-central Poland. Its seat is the town of Małkinia Górna, which lies approximately 16 kilometres (10 mi) south-east of Ostrów Mazowiecka and 90 km (56 mi) north-east of Warsaw.

The gmina covers an area of 134.08 square kilometres (51.8 sq mi), and as of 2006 its total population is 12,224 (12,048 in 2013).

== Villages ==
Gmina Małkinia Górna contains the villages and settlements of Błędnica, Boreczek, Borowe, Daniłówka Druga, Daniłówka Pierwsza, Daniłowo, Daniłowo-Parcele, Glina, Grądy, Kańkowo, Kiełczew, Klukowo, Małkinia Dolna, Małkinia Górna, Niegowiec, Orło, Podgórze-Gazdy, Poniatowo, Prostyń, Przewóz, Rostki Wielkie, Rostki-Piotrowice, Sumiężne, Treblinka, Żachy-Pawły, Zawisty Nadbużne and Zawisty Podleśne.

== Neighbouring gminas ==
Gmina Małkinia Górna is bordered by the gminas of Brańszczyk, Brok, Ceranów, Kosów Lacki, Ostrów Mazowiecka, Sadowne and Zaręby Kościelne.
