= Daniłówka Druga =

Village in Gmina Małkinia Górna, Poland

- Village
- Location within Poland
- Coordinates: 52°44′52″N 21°59′32″E
- Country: Poland
- Voivodeship: Masovian
- County: Ostrów
- Gmina: Małkinia Górna

Daniłówka Druga [daniˈwufka ˈdruɡa] is a village in the administrative district of Gmina Małkinia Górna, within Ostrów County, Masovian Voivodeship, in east-central Poland.
