= Gmina Kazimierz Biskupi =

Gmina Kazimierz Biskupi Kazimierz Biskupi Commune
- Gmina
- Flag Coat of arms

- Coordinates (Kazimierz Biskupi): 52°18′29″N 18°9′42″E
- Country: Poland
- Voivodeship: Greater Poland
- County: Konin County
- Seat: Kazimierz Biskupi

Area
  - Total: 107.96 km^{2} (41.68 sq mi)

Population (2006)
  - Total: 10,459
  - Density: 96.878/km^{2} (250.91/sq mi)
- Website: http://www.kazimierz-biskupi.pl/

Gmina Kazimierz Biskupi is a rural gmina (administrative district) in Konin County, Greater Poland Voivodeship, in west-central Poland. Its seat is the village of Kazimierz Biskupi, which lies approximately 13 kilometres (8 mi) north-west of Konin and 86 km (53 mi) east of the regional capital Poznań.

The gmina covers an area of 107.96 square kilometres (41.7 sq mi), and as of 2006 its total population is 10,459.

== Villages ==
Gmina Kazimierz Biskupi contains the villages and settlements of Anielewo, Bielawy, Bieniszew, Bochlewo, Bochlewo Drugie, Borowe, Cząstków, Daninów, Dębówka, Dobrosołowo, Dobrosołowo Drugie, Dobrosołowo Trzecie, Jóźwin, Kamienica, Kamienica-Majątek, Kazimierz Biskupi, Komorowo, Komorowo-Kolonia, Kozarzew, Kozarzewek, Ludwików, Marantów, Mokra, Nieświastów, Olesin, Olszowe, Posada, Radwaniec, Smuczyn, Sokółki, Stefanowo, Tokarki, Tokarki Drugie, Tokarki Pierwsze, Warznia, Wieruszew, Wierzchy, Włodzimirów, Wola Łaszczowa and Wygoda.

== Neighbouring gminas ==
Gmina Kazimierz Biskupi is bordered by the city of Konin and by the gminas of Golina, Kleczew, Ostrowite, Ślesin and Słupca.
