= Daniłówka Pierwsza =

Daniłówka Pierwsza, Poland
- Village
- Location within Poland
- Coordinates: 52°43′53″N 22°02′10″E
- Country: Poland
- Voivodeship: Masovian
- County: Ostrów
- Gmina: Małkinia Górna

Daniłówka Pierwsza [daniˈwufka ˈpjɛrfʂa] is a village in the administrative district of Gmina Małkinia Górna, within Ostrów County, Masovian Voivodeship, in east-central Poland.
