= Olszowe, Greater Poland Voivodeship =

Olszowe
- Settlement
- Location within Poland
- Coordinates: 52°18′49″N 18°12′15″E
- Country: Poland
- Voivodeship: Greater Poland
- County: Konin
- Gmina: Kazimierz Biskupi

Olszowe [ɔlˈʂɔvɛ] is a settlement in the administrative district of Gmina Kazimierz Biskupi, within Konin County, Greater Poland Voivodeship, in west-central Poland.
