= Mokra Mountain =

Mokra Mountain (Macedonian and Serbian: Мокра Планина, romanized: Mokra Planina, literally: "Wet Mountain") may refer to:

- Mokra Mountain, North Macedonia (Jakupica), a mountain in North Macedonia
- Mokra Mountain, Serbia, a mountain in Serbia

or:

- Mokra, Montenegro, a mountain in Montenegro
