= Małkinia Górna =

- Town
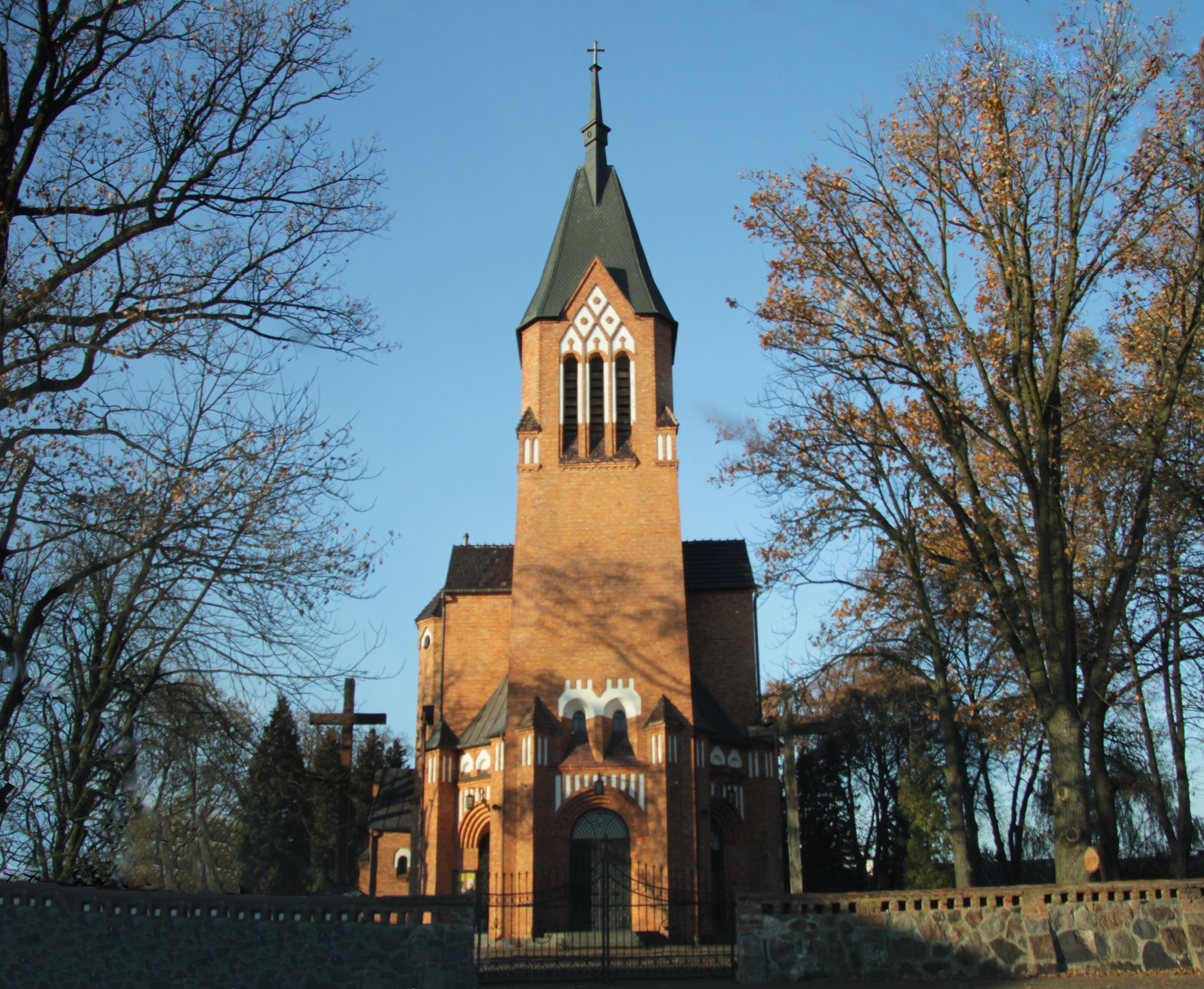
- Church of the Sacred Heart

- Location within Poland
- Coordinates: 52°41′37″N 22°03′02″E
- Country: Poland
- Voivodeship: Masovian
- County: Ostrów
- Gmina: Małkinia Górna
- Time zone: UTC+1 (CET)
  - Summer (DST): UTC+2 (CEST)
- Vehicle registration: WOR

Małkinia Górna [mau̯ˈkiɲa ˈɡurna] is a town in Ostrów County, Masovian Voivodeship, Poland. It is the seat of the administrative district called Gmina Małkinia Górna.

Małkinia is a railway junction. There, the main line between Warsaw and Białystok crosses with the less important line between Ostrołęka and Siedlce. During the German occupation of Poland in World War II the Treblinka extermination camp was located nearby. Prisoners were often held in locked trains at the Małkinia railway station awaiting transport into the camp.

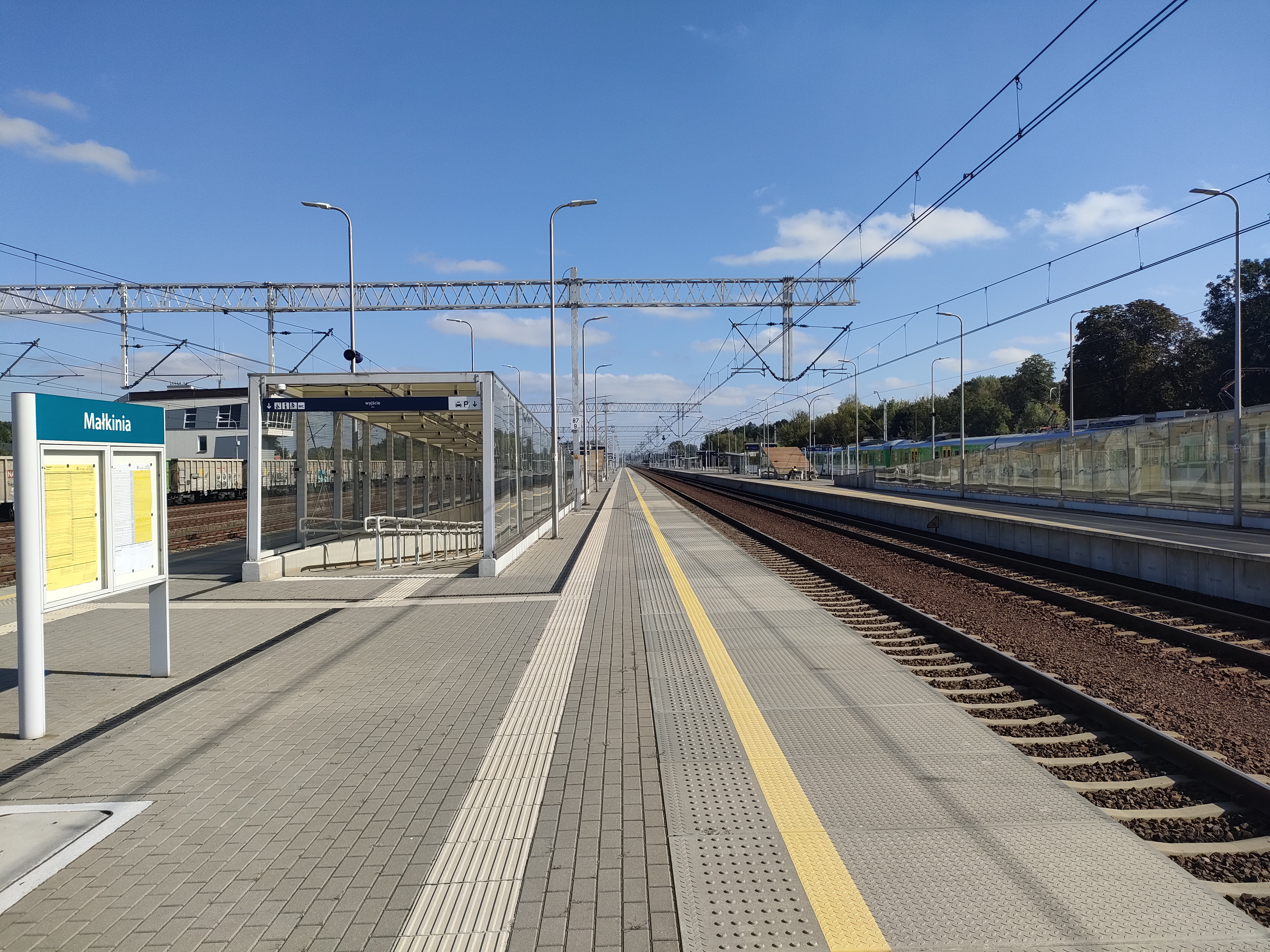
Railway station

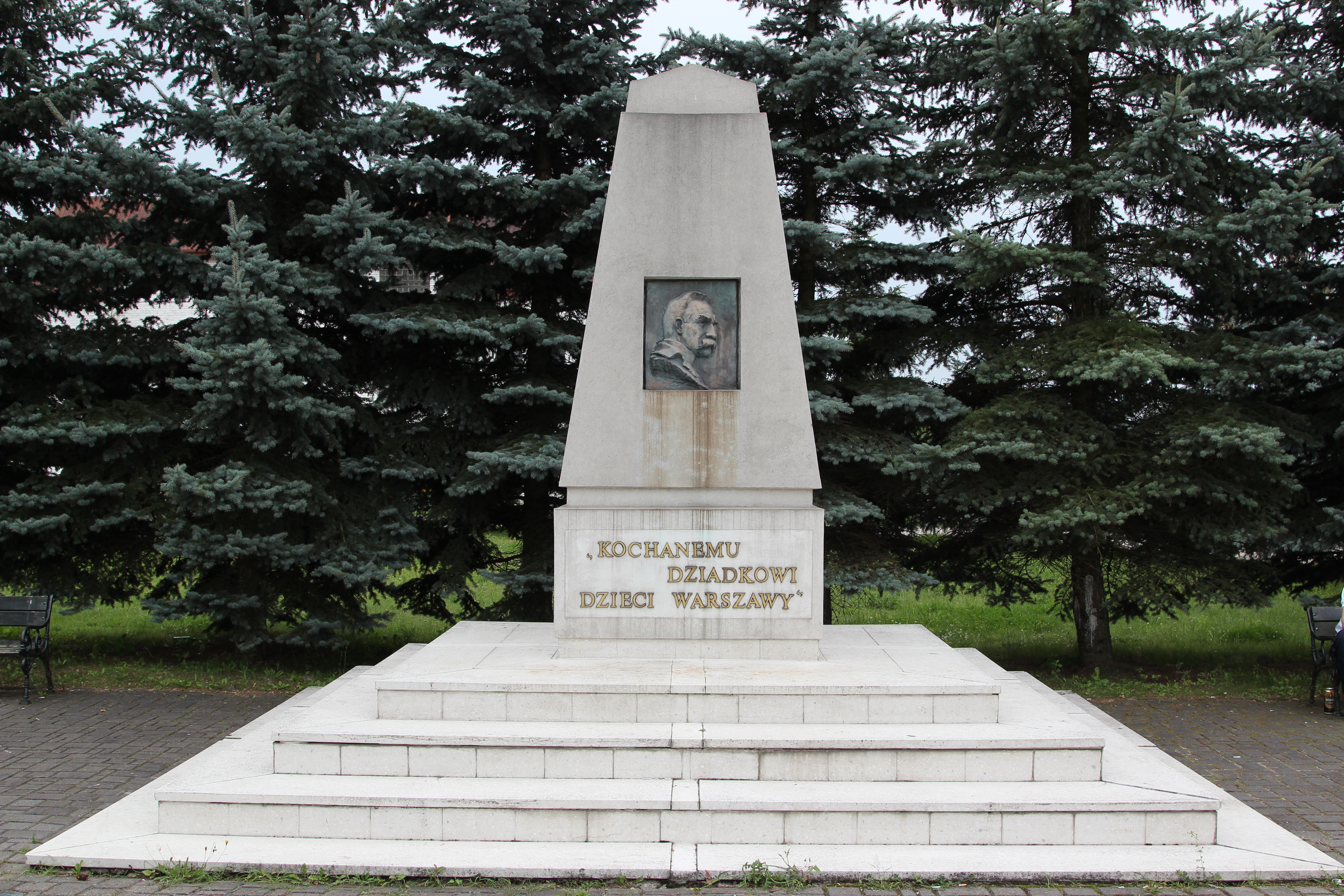
Józef Piłsudski Monument
