= Konin Coal Mine =

Mine in Konin, Poland

Konin coal mine
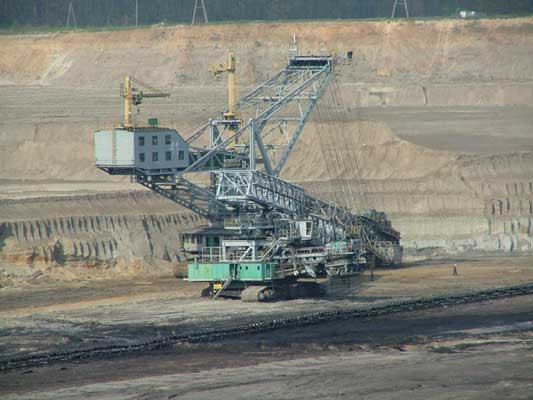
- The bucket-wheel excavator working on the lignite (brown coal) extraction site in Konin, Poland
- Interactive map of Konin coal mine
- Location: Konin, Greater Poland Voivodeship, Poland; 52°19′21″N 18°14′55″E
- Products: Coal
- Production: 20,000,000
- Opened: 1962
- Company: Kopalnia Wegla Brunatnego Konin

The Konin coal mine is a large mine in the central of Poland in Konin, Greater Poland Voivodeship, 186 km north-west of the capital, Warsaw. Konin represents one of the largest coal reserve in Poland having estimated reserves of 466.4 million tonnes of coal. The annual coal production is around 20 million tonnes.
