= Kazimierz Biskupi =

- Village
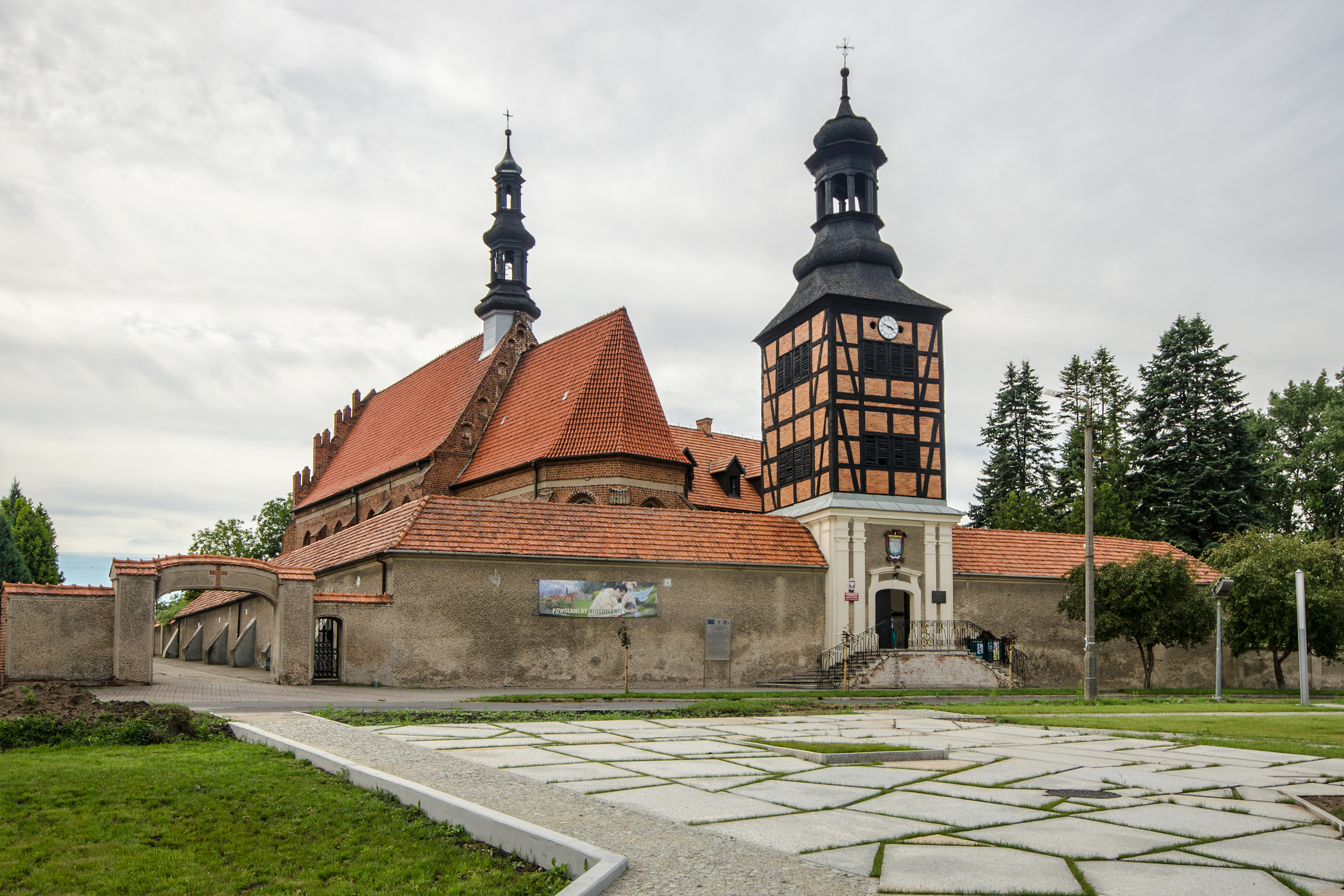
- Monastery in Kazimierz Biskupi

- Location within Poland
- Coordinates: 52°18′29″N 18°9′42″E
- Country: Poland
- Voivodeship: Greater Poland
- County: Konin
- Gmina: Kazimierz Biskupi

Population
  - Total: 4,280
- Vehicle registration: PKN
- Website: http://www.kazimierz-biskupi.pl

Kazimierz Biskupi (Polish pronunciation: [kaˈʑimjɛʐ bisˈkupi]) is a village in Konin County, Greater Poland Voivodeship, in central Poland. It is the seat of the gmina (administrative district) called Gmina Kazimierz Biskupi.
