= Zawisty =

Zawisty may refer to any of the following villages in Ostrów County, Masovian Voivodeship, in east-central Poland:

- Zawisty-Dworaki in the district of Gmina Boguty-Pianki
- Zawisty-Króle in the district of Gmina Boguty-Pianki
- Zawisty-Kruki in the district of Gmina Boguty-Pianki
- Zawisty-Piotrowice in the district of Gmina Boguty-Pianki
- Zawisty-Wity in the district of Gmina Boguty-Pianki
- Zawisty Nadbużne in the district of Gmina Małkinia Górna
- Zawisty Podleśne in the district of Gmina Małkinia Górna
