= Złotki =

Złotki may refer to:

- Złotki, Węgrów County
- Kolonia Złotki
- Szlasy-Złotki
- Złotki-Pułapki
- Złotki-Przeczki
- Złotki-Starowieś
