= Murawskie-Miazgi =

- Village
- Location within Poland
- Coordinates: 52°47′34″N 22°24′6″E
- Country: Poland
- Voivodeship: Masovian
- County: Ostrów
- Gmina: Boguty-Pianki
- Population: 30

Murawskie-Miazgi [muˈrafskʲɛ ˈmjazɡi] is a village in the administrative district of Gmina Boguty-Pianki, within Ostrów County, Masovian Voivodeship, in east-central Poland.

== History ==
From 1921 to 1931, the village was located in the Białystok Voivodeship, in Ostrołęka County, and was part of the gmina of Boguty.

According to the 1921 census, the village had a population of 32 living in five residential buildings. The village belonged to the Roman Catholic parish in Czyżew. It was under the jurisdiction of the grodzki court in Czyżew and the district court in Łomża, while the local post office was located in Czyżew.

Following the Soviet invasion of Poland in September 1939, the village came under Soviet occupation. From June 1941, it was under German occupation. From 22 July 1941 until 1945, it was incorporated into Landkreis Lomscha in Bezirk Bialystok, part of Nazi Germany.

From 1975 to 1998, the village was administratively part of the Łomża Voivodeship.
