= Strękowo-Nieczykowskie =

- Village
- Location within Poland
- Coordinates: 52°42′22″N 22°17′57″E
- Country: Poland
- Voivodeship: Masovian
- County: Ostrów
- Gmina: Nur
- Population: 50

Strękowo-Nieczykowskie [strɛŋˈkɔvɔ ɲɛt͡ʂɨˈkɔfskʲɛ] is a village in the administrative district of Gmina Nur, within Ostrów County, Masovian Voivodeship, in east-central Poland.
