= Tymianki-Adamy =

- Village
- Location within Poland
- Coordinates: 52°40′35″N 22°26′16″E
- Country: Poland
- Voivodeship: Masovian
- County: Ostrów
- Gmina: Boguty-Pianki
- Elevation: 125 m (410 ft)
- Population: 120

Tymianki-Adamy [tɨˈmjaŋki aˈdamɨ] is a village in the administrative district of Gmina Boguty-Pianki, within Ostrów County, Masovian Voivodeship, in east-central Poland.
