= Zgorzałowo =

- Village
- Location within Poland
- Coordinates: 52°53′48″N 21°44′11″E
- Country: Poland
- Voivodeship: Masovian
- County: Ostrów
- Gmina: Wąsewo

Zgorzałowo [zɡɔʐaˈwɔvɔ] is a village in the administrative district of Gmina Wąsewo, within Ostrów County, Masovian Voivodeship, in east-central Poland.
