= Boguty-Milczki =

- Village
- Location within Poland
- Coordinates: 52°44′58″N 22°24′51″E
- Country: Poland
- Voivodeship: Masovian
- County: Ostrów
- Gmina: Boguty-Pianki

Boguty-Milczki [bɔˈɡutɨ ˈmilt͡ʂki] is a village in the administrative district of Gmina Boguty-Pianki, within Ostrów County, Masovian Voivodeship, in east-central Poland.
