= Pieńki-Żaki =

- Village
- Location within Poland
- Coordinates: 52°49′10″N 22°14′30″E
- Country: Poland
- Voivodeship: Masovian
- County: Ostrów
- Gmina: Andrzejewo
- Population: 80

Pieńki-Żaki [ˈpjɛɲki ˈʐaki] is a village in the administrative district of Gmina Andrzejewo, within Ostrów County, Masovian Voivodeship, in east-central Poland.
