= Żelazy-Brokowo =

- Village
- Location within Poland
- Coordinates: 52°47′34″N 22°16′5″E
- Country: Poland
- Voivodeship: Masovian
- County: Ostrów
- Gmina: Andrzejewo
- Population: 50

Żelazy-Brokowo [ʐɛˈlazɨ brɔˈkɔvɔ] is a village in the administrative district of Gmina Andrzejewo, within Ostrów County, Masovian Voivodeship, in east-central Poland.
