= Zaręby-Bolędy =

- Village
- Location within Poland
- Coordinates: 52°50′36″N 22°16′39″E
- Country: Poland
- Voivodeship: Masovian
- County: Ostrów
- Gmina: Andrzejewo
- Population: 140

Zaręby-Bolędy [zaˈrɛmbɨ bɔˈlɛndɨ] is a village in the administrative district of Gmina Andrzejewo, within Ostrów County, Masovian Voivodeship, in east-central Poland.
