= Grędzice, Gmina Szulborze Wielkie =

Grędzice
- Village
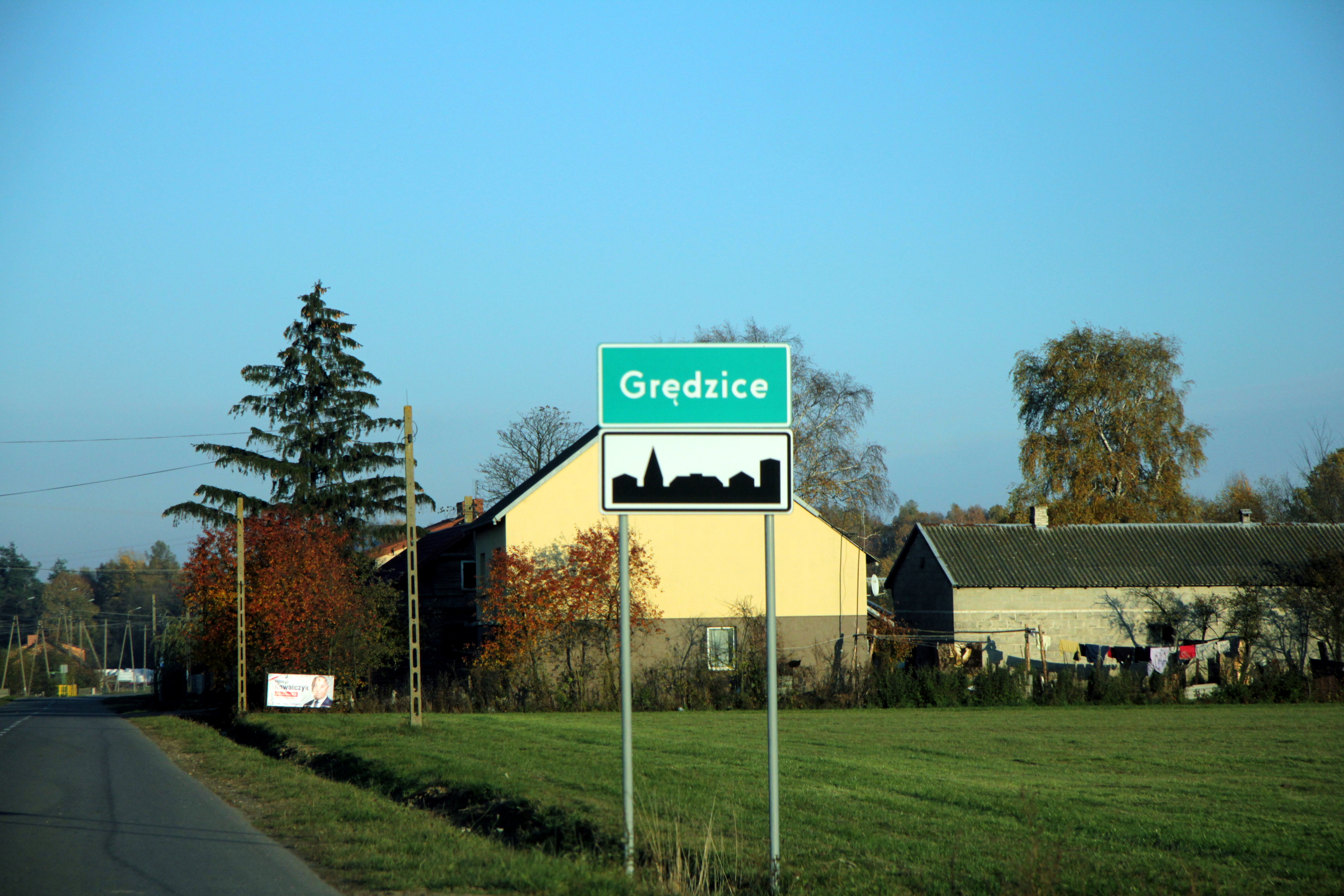

- Location within Poland
- Coordinates: 52°45′37″N 22°11′36″E
- Country: Poland
- Voivodeship: Masovian
- County: Ostrów
- Gmina: Szulborze Wielkie
- Population: 150

Grędzice [ɡrɛnˈd͡ʑit͡sɛ] is a village in the administrative district of Gmina Szulborze Wielkie, within Ostrów County, Masovian Voivodeship, in east-central Poland.
