= Boguty-Leśne =

- Village
- Location within Poland
- Coordinates: 52°44′7″N 22°24′23″E
- Country: Poland
- Voivodeship: Masovian
- County: Ostrów
- Gmina: Boguty-Pianki
- Population: 70

Boguty-Leśne [bɔˈɡutɨ ˈlɛɕnɛ] is a village in the administrative district of Gmina Boguty-Pianki, within Ostrów County, Masovian Voivodeship, in east-central Poland.
