= Zaszków =

- Village
- Location within Poland
- Coordinates: 52°38′N 22°27′E
- Country: Poland
- Voivodeship: Masovian
- County: Ostrów
- Gmina: Nur
- Elevation: 125 m (410 ft)
- Population: 187

Zaszków [ˈzaʂkuf] is a village in the administrative district of Gmina Nur, within Ostrów County, Masovian Voivodeship, in east-central Poland.
