= Wąsewo-Lachowiec =

- Village
- Location within Poland
- Coordinates: 52°50′44″N 21°41′20″E
- Country: Poland
- Voivodeship: Masovian
- County: Ostrów
- Gmina: Wąsewo

Wąsewo-Lachowiec [vɔ̃ˈsɛvɔ laˈxɔvjɛt͡s] is a village in the administrative district of Gmina Wąsewo, within Ostrów County, Masovian Voivodeship, in east-central Poland.
