= Bagatele =

- Village
- Location within Poland
- Coordinates: 52°51′N 21°42′E
- Country: Poland
- Voivodeship: Masovian
- County: Ostrów
- Gmina: Wąsewo

Population
  - Total: 140
- Time zone: UTC+1 (CET)
  - Summer (DST): UTC+2 (CEST)
- Postal code: 07-311
- Vehicle registration: WOR

Bagatele [baɡaˈtɛlɛ] is a village in the administrative district of Gmina Wąsewo, within Ostrów County, Masovian Voivodeship, in east-central Poland.

On 8 September 1939, during the German invasion of Poland at the start of World War II, German troops perpetrated a massacre of 11 Poles in Bagatele (see also Nazi crimes against the Polish nation). The victims were three local farmers and eight refugees from other locations.
