= Smolewo-Wieś =

- Village
- Location within Poland
- Coordinates: 52°43′59″N 22°14′9″E
- Country: Poland
- Voivodeship: Masovian
- County: Ostrów
- Gmina: Szulborze Wielkie
- Population: 170

Smolewo-Wieś [smɔˈlɛvɔ ˈvjɛɕ] is a village in the administrative district of Gmina Szulborze Wielkie, within Ostrów County, Masovian Voivodeship, in east-central Poland.
