= Godlewo Milewek =

- Village
- Location within Poland
- Coordinates: 52°43′N 22°20′E
- Country: Poland
- Voivodeship: Masovian
- County: Ostrów
- Gmina: Nur

Godlewo Milewek [ɡɔdˈlɛvɔ miˈlɛvɛk] is a village in the administrative district of Gmina Nur, within Ostrów County, Masovian Voivodeship, in east-central Poland.
