= Janowo, Gmina Andrzejewo =

Janowo
- Village
- Location within Poland
- Coordinates: 52°48′15″N 22°09′45″E
- Country: Poland
- Voivodeship: Masovian
- County: Ostrów
- Gmina: Andrzejewo

Janowo [jaˈnɔvɔ] is a village in the administrative district of Gmina Andrzejewo, within Ostrów County, Masovian Voivodeship, in east-central Poland.
