= Kraszewo-Czarne =

- Village
- Location within Poland
- Coordinates: 52°47′18″N 22°23′29″E
- Country: Poland
- Voivodeship: Masovian
- County: Ostrów
- Gmina: Boguty-Pianki
- Population: 39

Kraszewo-Czarne [kraˈʂɛvɔ ˈt͡ʂarnɛ] is a village in the administrative district of Gmina Boguty-Pianki, within Ostrów County, Masovian Voivodeship, in east-central Poland.
