= Przeździecko-Dworaki =

- Village
- Location within Poland
- Coordinates: 52°50′49″N 22°14′15″E
- Country: Poland
- Voivodeship: Masovian
- County: Ostrów
- Gmina: Andrzejewo
- Population: 60

Przeździecko-Dworaki [pʂɛʑˈd͡ʑɛt͡skɔ dvɔˈraki] is a village in the administrative district of Gmina Andrzejewo, within Ostrów County, Masovian Voivodeship, in east-central Poland.
