= Rząśnik Włościański =

- Village
- Location within Poland
- Coordinates: 52°51′18″N 21°43′21″E
- Country: Poland
- Voivodeship: Masovian
- County: Ostrów
- Gmina: Wąsewo
- Population (approx.): 130
- Website: http://www.rzasnikwl.pl

Rząśnik Włościański (Polish pronunciation: [ˈʐɔ̃ɕɲik fwɔɕˈtɕaj̃skʲi]) is a village in the administrative district of Gmina Wąsewo, within Ostrów County, Masovian Voivodeship, in east-central Poland.
