= Przeździecko-Jachy =

- Village
- Location within Poland
- Coordinates: 52°52′9″N 22°13′46″E
- Country: Poland
- Voivodeship: Masovian
- County: Ostrów
- Gmina: Andrzejewo
- Population: 160

Przeździecko-Jachy [pʂɛʑˈd͡ʑɛt͡skɔ ˈjaxɨ] is a village in the administrative district of Gmina Andrzejewo, within Ostrów County, Masovian Voivodeship, in east-central Poland.
