= Kutyłowo-Perysie =

- Village
- Location within Poland
- Coordinates: 52°45′45″N 22°25′51″E
- Country: Poland
- Voivodeship: Masovian
- County: Ostrów
- Gmina: Boguty-Pianki
- Elevation: 139 m (456 ft)
- Population: 180

Kutyłowo-Perysie [kutɨˈwɔvɔ pɛˈrɨɕɛ] is a village in the administrative district of Gmina Boguty-Pianki, within Ostrów County, Masovian Voivodeship, in east-central Poland.
