= Tymianki-Okunie =

- Village
- Location within Poland
- Coordinates: 52°40′50″N 22°23′51″E
- Country: Poland
- Voivodeship: Masovian
- County: Ostrów
- Gmina: Boguty-Pianki
- Elevation: 128 m (420 ft)
- Population: 90

Tymianki-Okunie [tɨˈmjaŋki ɔˈkuɲɛ] is a village in the administrative district of Gmina Boguty-Pianki, within Ostrów County, Masovian Voivodeship, in east-central Poland.
