= Zaszków Kolonia =

- Village
- Location within Poland
- Coordinates: 52°38′18″N 22°25′3″E
- Country: Poland
- Voivodeship: Masovian
- County: Ostrów
- Gmina: Nur
- Population: 70

Zaszków Kolonia [ˈzaʂkuf kɔˈlɔɲa] is a village in the administrative district of Gmina Nur, within Ostrów County, Masovian Voivodeship, in east-central Poland.
