= Żebry Kolonia =

- Village
- Location within Poland
- Coordinates: 52°40′N 22°21′E
- Country: Poland
- Voivodeship: Masovian
- County: Ostrów
- Gmina: Nur

Żebry Kolonia [ˈʐɛbrɨ kɔˈlɔɲa] is a village in the administrative district of Gmina Nur, within Ostrów County, Masovian Voivodeship, in east-central Poland.
