= Wąsewo-Kolonia =

- Village
- Location within Poland
- Coordinates: 52°52′32″N 21°41′40″E
- Country: Poland
- Voivodeship: Masovian
- County: Ostrów
- Gmina: Wąsewo

Wąsewo-Kolonia [vɔ̃ˈsɛvɔ kɔˈlɔɲa] is a village in the administrative district of Gmina Wąsewo, within Ostrów County, Masovian Voivodeship, in east-central Poland.
