= Mianowo, Gmina Andrzejewo =

Mianowo
- Village
- Location within Poland
- Coordinates: 52°47′38″N 22°12′20″E
- Country: Poland
- Voivodeship: Masovian
- County: Ostrów
- Gmina: Andrzejewo
- Population: 250

Mianowo [mjaˈnɔvɔ] is a village in the administrative district of Gmina Andrzejewo, within Ostrów County, Masovian Voivodeship, in east-central Poland.
