= Kramkowo Lipskie =

- Village
- Location within Poland
- Coordinates: 52°40′N 22°24′E
- Country: Poland
- Voivodeship: Masovian
- County: Ostrów
- Gmina: Nur
- Population: 166

Kramkowo Lipskie [kramˈkɔvɔ ˈlipskʲɛ] is a village in the administrative district of Gmina Nur, within Ostrów County, Masovian Voivodeship, in east-central Poland.
