= Tymianki-Dębosze =

- Village
- Location within Poland
- Coordinates: 52°40′58″N 22°24′2″E
- Country: Poland
- Voivodeship: Masovian
- County: Ostrów
- Gmina: Boguty-Pianki

Tymianki-Dębosze [tɨˈmjaŋki dɛmˈbɔʂɛ] is a village in the administrative district of Gmina Boguty-Pianki, within Ostrów County, Masovian Voivodeship, in east-central Poland.
