= Kamianka, Gmina Nur =

Kamianka
- Village
- Location within Poland
- Coordinates: 52°39′32″N 22°21′42″E
- Country: Poland
- Voivodeship: Masovian
- County: Ostrów
- Gmina: Nur
- Population: 30

Kamianka [kaˈmjanka] is a village in the administrative district of Gmina Nur, within Ostrów County, Masovian Voivodeship, in east-central Poland.
