= Kuleszki-Nienałty =

- Village
- Location within Poland
- Coordinates: 52°47′58″N 22°08′44″E
- Country: Poland
- Voivodeship: Masovian
- County: Ostrów
- Gmina: Andrzejewo

Kuleszki-Nienałty (Polish pronunciation: [kuˈlɛʂkʲi ɲɛˈɲawtɨ]) is a village in the administrative district of Gmina Andrzejewo, within Ostrów County, Masovian Voivodeship, in east-central Poland.
