= Olszewo-Cechny =

- Village
- Location within Poland
- Coordinates: 52°48′56″N 22°11′31″E
- Country: Poland
- Voivodeship: Masovian
- County: Ostrów
- Gmina: Andrzejewo
- Population: 70

Olszewo-Cechny [ɔlˈʂɛvɔ ˈt͡sɛxnɨ] is a village in the administrative district of Gmina Andrzejewo, within Ostrów County, Masovian Voivodeship, in east-central Poland.
