= Ołtarze Gołacze =

- Village
- Location within Poland
- Coordinates: 52°41′N 22°16′E
- Country: Poland
- Voivodeship: Masovian
- County: Ostrów
- Gmina: Nur

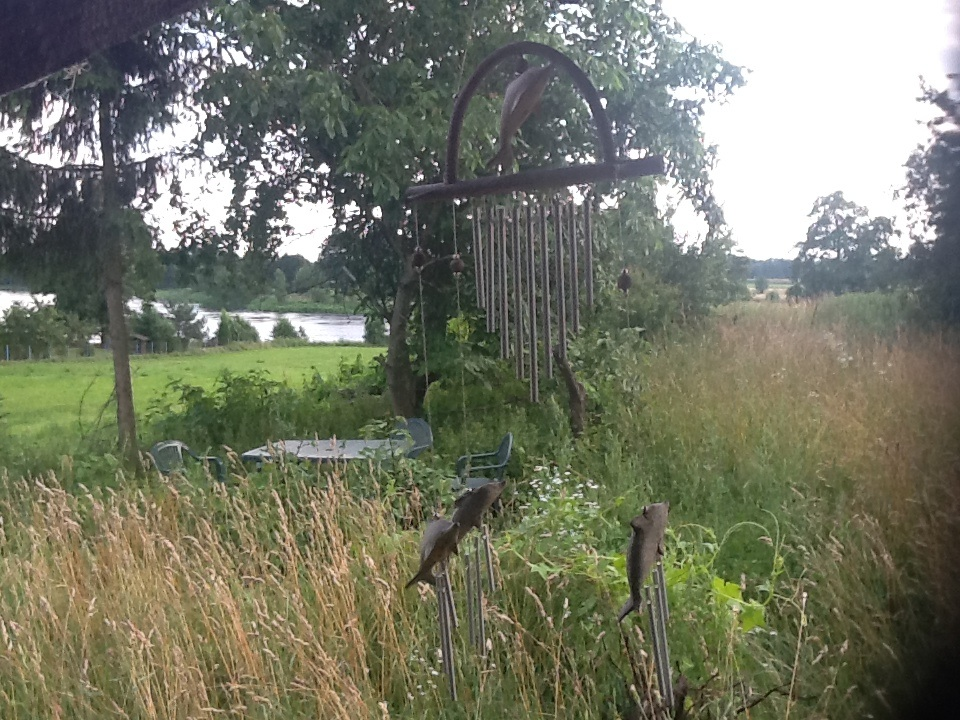
Ołtarze-Gołacze upon Bug.

Ołtarze Gołacze [ɔu̯ˈtaʐɛ ɡɔˈwat͡ʂɛ] is a village in the administrative district of Gmina Nur, within Ostrów County, Masovian Voivodeship, in east-central Poland.
