= Brulino-Lipskie =

- Village
- Location within Poland
- Coordinates: 52°46′24″N 22°17′36″E
- Country: Poland
- Voivodeship: Masovian
- County: Ostrów
- Gmina: Szulborze Wielkie

Brulino-Lipskie [bruˈlinɔ ˈlipskʲɛ] is a village in the administrative district of Gmina Szulborze Wielkie, within Ostrów County, Masovian Voivodeship, in east-central Poland.
