= Rynek =

Rynek may refer to the following:

- Rynek, Masovian Voivodeship (east-central Poland)
- Rynek, Warmian-Masurian Voivodeship (north Poland)
- Rynek Kolejowy, Polish magazine
