= Smolewo-Parcele =

- Village
- Location within Poland
- Coordinates: 52°43′19″N 22°14′23″E
- Country: Poland
- Voivodeship: Masovian
- County: Ostrów
- Gmina: Szulborze Wielkie

Smolewo-Parcele [smɔˈlɛvɔ parˈt͡sɛlɛ] is a village in the administrative district of Gmina Szulborze Wielkie, within Ostrów County, Masovian Voivodeship, in east-central Poland.
