= Godlewo-Gudosze =

- Village
- Location within Poland
- Coordinates: 52°45′39″N 22°17′09″E
- Country: Poland
- Voivodeship: Masovian
- County: Ostrów
- Gmina: Szulborze Wielkie

Godlewo-Gudosze [ɡɔdˈlɛvɔ ɡuˈdɔʂɛ] is a village in the administrative district of Gmina Szulborze Wielkie, within Ostrów County, Masovian Voivodeship, in east-central Poland.
