= Kossaki, Masovian Voivodeship =

Kossaki
- Village
- Location within Poland
- Coordinates: 52°38′54″N 22°21′47″E
- Country: Poland
- Voivodeship: Masovian
- County: Ostrów
- Gmina: Nur

Kossaki [kɔsˈsaki] is a village in the administrative district of Gmina Nur, within Ostrów County, Masovian Voivodeship, in east-central Poland.
