= Słup-Kolonia =

- Village
- Location within Poland
- Coordinates: 52°45′25″N 22°15′43″E
- Country: Poland
- Voivodeship: Masovian
- County: Ostrów
- Gmina: Szulborze Wielkie

Słup-Kolonia [ˈswup kɔˈlɔɲa] is a village in the administrative district of Gmina Szulborze Wielkie, within Ostrów County, Masovian Voivodeship, in east-central Poland.
