= Obryte, Gmina Nur =

Obryte
- Village
- Location within Poland
- Coordinates: 52°37′N 22°23′E
- Country: Poland
- Voivodeship: Masovian
- County: Ostrów
- Gmina: Nur
- Elevation: 110 m (360 ft)
- Population: 80

Obryte [ɔˈbrɨtɛ] is a village in the administrative district of Gmina Nur, within Ostrów County, Masovian Voivodeship, in east-central Poland.
