= Mokrylas =

- Village
- Location within Poland
- Coordinates: 52°53′44″N 21°41′10″E
- Country: Poland
- Voivodeship: Masovian
- County: Ostrów
- Gmina: Wąsewo

Mokrylas [mɔˈkrɨlas] is a village in the administrative district of Gmina Wąsewo, within Ostrów County, Masovian Voivodeship, in east-central Poland.
