= Jasienica-Parcele =

- Village
- Location within Poland
- Coordinates: 52°48′19″N 22°4′16″E
- Country: Poland
- Voivodeship: Masovian
- County: Ostrów
- Gmina: Andrzejewo
- Population: 100

Jasienica-Parcele [jaɕɛˈnit͡sa parˈt͡sɛlɛ] is a village in the administrative district of Gmina Andrzejewo, within Ostrów County, Masovian Voivodeship, in east-central Poland.
