= Drewnowo-Ziemaki =

- Village
- Location within Poland
- Coordinates: 52°43′26″N 22°23′11″E
- Country: Poland
- Voivodeship: Masovian
- County: Ostrów
- Gmina: Boguty-Pianki
- Time zone: UTC+1 (CET)
  - Summer (DST): UTC+2 (CEST)
- Vehicle registration: WOR

Drewnowo-Ziemaki [drɛvˈnɔvɔ ʑɛˈmaki] is a village in the administrative district of Gmina Boguty-Pianki, within Ostrów County, Masovian Voivodeship, in east-central Poland.

== History ==
Drewnowo-Ziemaki along with Drewnowo-Gołyń, Drewnowo-Dmoszki, Drewnowo-Konarze and Drewnowo-Lipskie was a part of the okolica szlachecka of Drewnowo.
