= Zakrzewo-Zalesie =

- Village
- Location within Poland
- Coordinates: 52°44′N 22°13′E
- Country: Poland
- Voivodeship: Masovian
- County: Ostrów
- Gmina: Szulborze Wielkie

Zakrzewo-Zalesie [zaˈkʂɛvɔ zaˈlɛɕɛ] is a village in the administrative district of Gmina Szulborze Wielkie, within Ostrów County, Masovian Voivodeship, in east-central Poland.
