= Helenowo, Masovian Voivodeship =

Helenowo
- Village
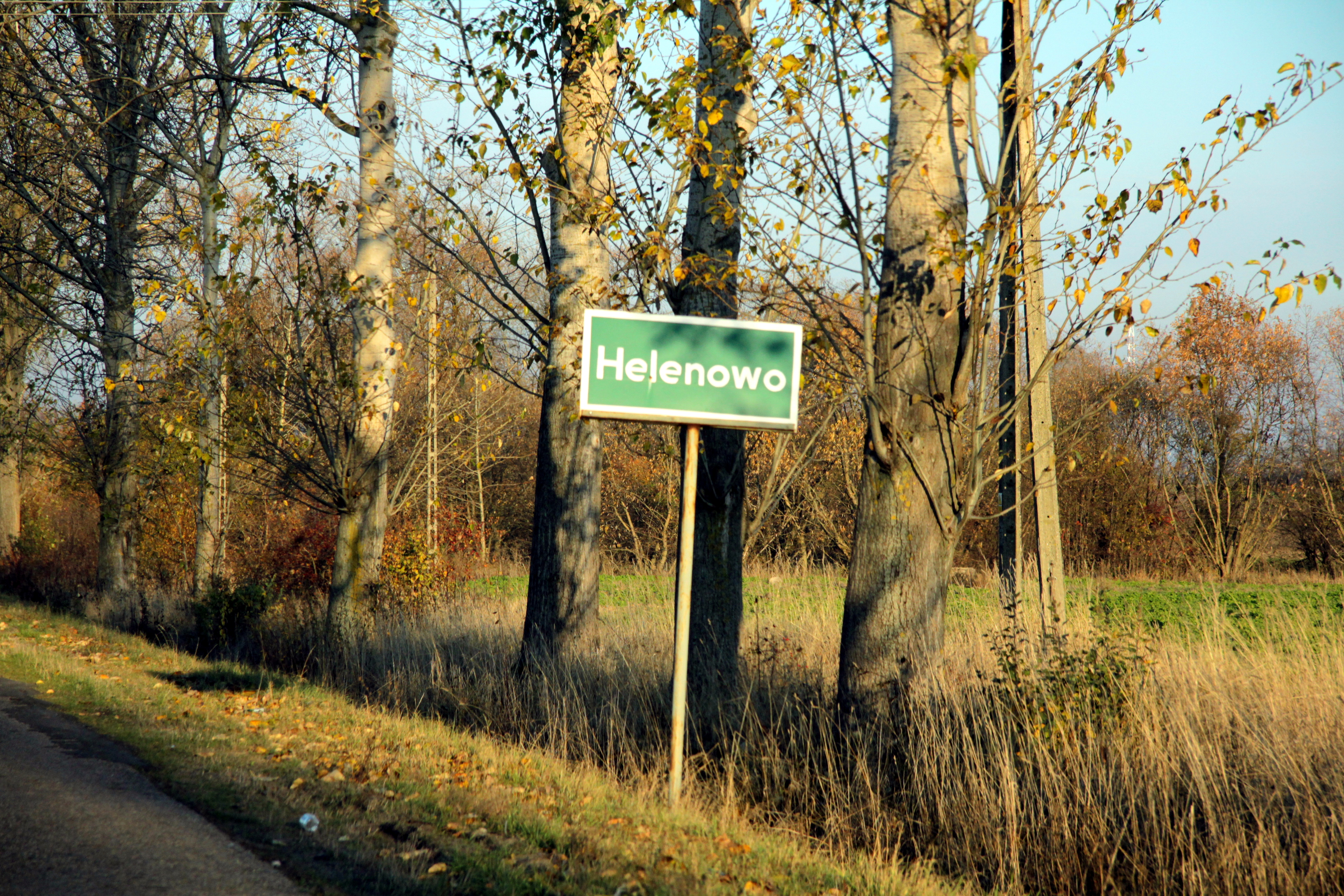

- Location within Poland
- Coordinates: 52°46′44″N 22°15′41″E
- Country: Poland
- Voivodeship: Masovian
- County: Ostrów
- Gmina: Szulborze Wielkie

Helenowo [xɛlɛˈnɔvɔ] is a village in the administrative district of Gmina Szulborze Wielkie, in Ostrów County of the Mazovia Province in east-central Poland.
