= Murawskie-Czachy =

- Village
- Location within Poland
- Coordinates: 52°46′58″N 22°23′40″E
- Country: Poland
- Voivodeship: Masovian
- County: Ostrów
- Gmina: Boguty-Pianki
- Population: 30

Murawskie-Czachy [muˈrafskʲɛ ˈt͡ʂaxɨ] is a village in the administrative district of Gmina Boguty-Pianki, within Ostrów County, Masovian Voivodeship, in east-central Poland.
