= Nowe Kaczkowo =

- Village
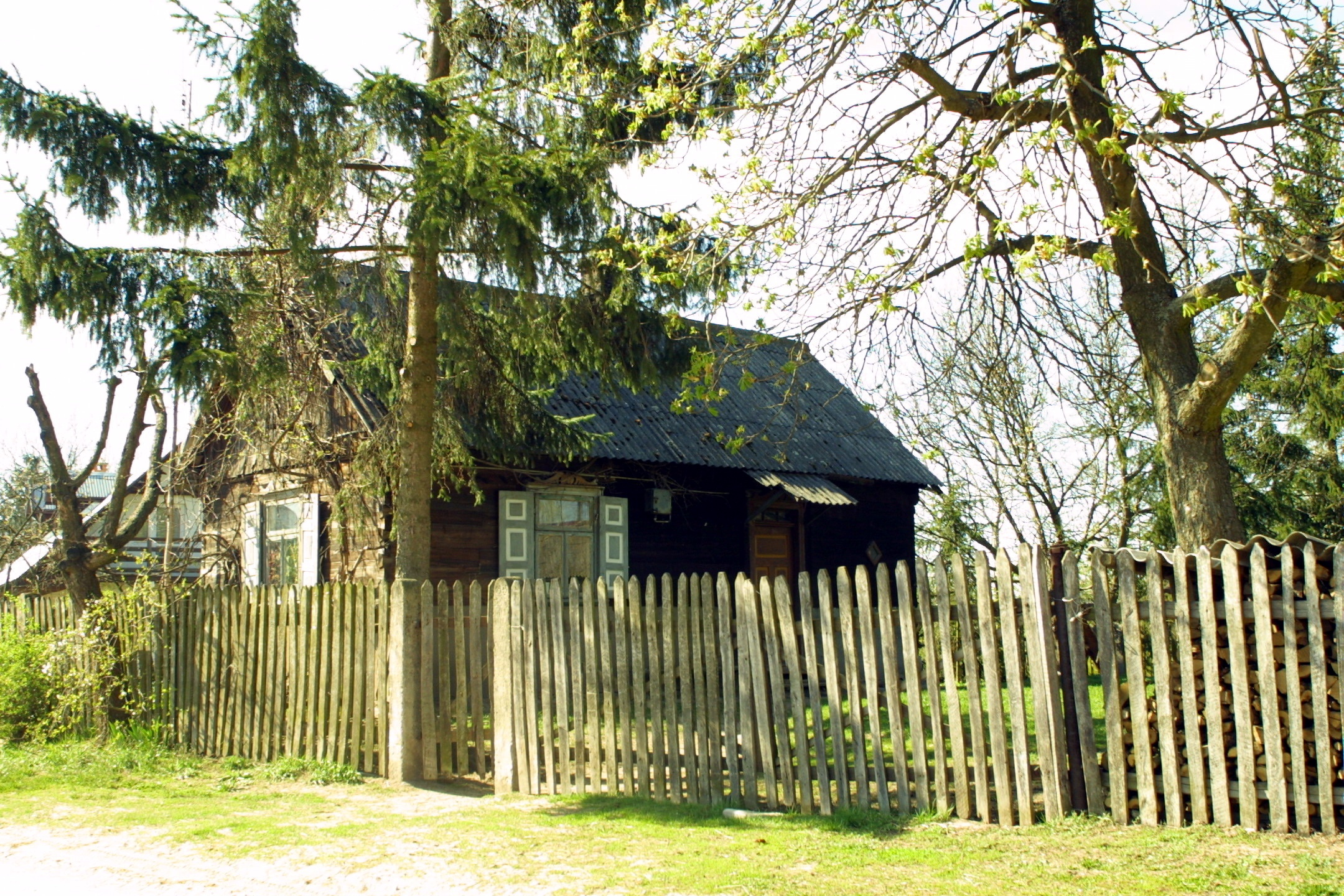
- Cottage in Nowe Kaczkowo Village, Brok Commune, Poland

- Location within Poland
- Coordinates: 52°43′46″N 21°57′41″E
- Country: Poland
- Voivodeship: Masovian
- County: Ostrów
- Gmina: Brok

Nowe Kaczkowo [ˈnɔvɛ kat͡ʂˈkɔvɔ] is a village in the administrative district of Gmina Brok, within Ostrów County, Masovian Voivodeship, in east-central Poland.
