= Kowalówka, Masovian Voivodeship =

Kowalówka
- Village
- Location within Poland
- Coordinates: 52°48′50″N 22°6′5″E
- Country: Poland
- Voivodeship: Masovian
- County: Ostrów
- Gmina: Andrzejewo
- Population: 170

Kowalówka [kɔvaˈlufka] is a village in the administrative district of Gmina Andrzejewo, within Ostrów County, Masovian Voivodeship, in east-central Poland.
