= Dąbrowa, Gmina Andrzejewo =

Dąbrowa
- Village
- Location within Poland
- Coordinates: 52°47′38″N 22°7′27″E
- Country: Poland
- Voivodeship: Masovian
- County: Ostrów
- Gmina: Andrzejewo
- Population: 210

Dąbrowa [dɔmˈbrɔva] is a village in the administrative district of Gmina Andrzejewo, within Ostrów County, Masovian Voivodeship, in east-central Poland.
