= Trynosy =

- Village
- Location within Poland
- Coordinates: 52°53′N 21°46′E
- Country: Poland
- Voivodeship: Masovian
- County: Ostrów
- Gmina: Wąsewo

Trynosy [trɨˈnɔsɨ] is a village in the administrative district of Gmina Wąsewo, within Ostrów County, Masovian Voivodeship, in east-central Poland.
