= Tymianki-Bucie =

- Village
- Location within Poland
- Coordinates: 52°40′50″N 22°25′0″E
- Country: Poland
- Voivodeship: Masovian
- County: Ostrów
- Gmina: Boguty-Pianki
- Elevation: 125 m (410 ft)
- Population: 90

Tymianki-Bucie [tɨˈmjaŋki ˈbut͡ɕɛ] is a village in the administrative district of Gmina Boguty-Pianki, within Ostrów County, Masovian Voivodeship, in east-central Poland.
