= Brudki Nowe =

- Village
- Location within Poland
- Coordinates: 52°50′N 21°41′E
- Country: Poland
- Voivodeship: Masovian
- County: Ostrów
- Gmina: Wąsewo
- Population: 70

Brudki Nowe [ˈbrutki ˈnɔvɛ] is a village in the administrative district of Gmina Wąsewo, within Ostrów County, Masovian Voivodeship, in east-central Poland.
