= Gostkowo, Gmina Szulborze Wielkie =

Gostkowo
- Village
- Location within Poland
- Coordinates: 52°47′N 22°15′E
- Country: Poland
- Voivodeship: Masovian
- County: Ostrów
- Gmina: Szulborze Wielkie

Gostkowo [ɡɔstˈkɔvɔ] is a village in the administrative district of Gmina Szulborze Wielkie, within Ostrów County, Masovian Voivodeship, in east-central Poland.

== Monuments ==
- Statue of St. John of Nepomuk
