= Leśniewo =

Leśniewo may refer to the following places:

- Leśniewo, Greater Poland Voivodeship (west-central Poland)
- Leśniewo, Maków County in Masovian Voivodeship (east-central Poland)
- Leśniewo, Gmina Szulborze Wielkie, Ostrów County in Masovian Voivodeship (east-central Poland)
- Leśniewo, Pomeranian Voivodeship (north Poland)
- Leśniewo, Warmian-Masurian Voivodeship (north Poland)
