= Nur-Kolonia Wschodnia =

- Settlement
- Location within Poland
- Coordinates: 52°39′36″N 22°20′39″E
- Country: Poland
- Voivodeship: Masovian
- County: Ostrów
- Gmina: Nur

Nur-Kolonia Wschodnia [ˈnur kɔˈlɔɲa ˈfsxɔdɲa] is a settlement in the administrative district of Gmina Nur, within Ostrów County, Masovian Voivodeship, in east-central Poland.
