= Majdan Suski =

- Village
- Location within Poland
- Coordinates: 52°50′55″N 21°37′26″E
- Country: Poland
- Voivodeship: Masovian
- County: Ostrów
- Gmina: Wąsewo

Majdan Suski (Polish pronunciation: [ˈmajdan ˈsuskʲi]) is a village in the administrative district of Gmina Wąsewo, within Ostrów County, Masovian Voivodeship, in east-central Poland.
