= Pieńki-Sobótki =

- Village
- Location within Poland
- Coordinates: 52°48′44″N 22°12′57″E
- Country: Poland
- Voivodeship: Masovian
- County: Ostrów
- Gmina: Andrzejewo
- Population: 80

Pieńki-Sobótki [ˈpjɛɲki sɔˈbutki] is a village in the administrative district of Gmina Andrzejewo, within Ostrów County, Masovian Voivodeship, in east-central Poland.
