= Ołdaki-Polonia =

- Village
- Location within Poland
- Coordinates: 52°52′32″N 22°16′10″E
- Country: Poland
- Voivodeship: Masovian
- County: Ostrów
- Gmina: Andrzejewo
- Population: 110

Ołdaki-Polonia [ɔu̯ˈdaki pɔˈlɔɲa] is a village in the administrative district of Gmina Andrzejewo, within Ostrów County, Masovian Voivodeship, in east-central Poland.
