= Łętownica-Parcele =

- Village
- Location within Poland
- Coordinates: 52°51′37″N 22°12′43″E
- Country: Poland
- Voivodeship: Masovian
- County: Ostrów
- Gmina: Andrzejewo
- Population: 90

Łętownica-Parcele [wɛntɔvˈnit͡sa parˈt͡sɛlɛ] is a village in the administrative district of Gmina Andrzejewo, within Ostrów County, Masovian Voivodeship, in east-central Poland.
