= Kamieńczyk-Pierce =

- Village
- Location within Poland
- Coordinates: 52°43′29″N 22°21′29″E
- Country: Poland
- Voivodeship: Masovian
- County: Ostrów
- Gmina: Boguty-Pianki

Kamieńczyk-Pierce (Polish pronunciation: [kaˈmjɛj̃tʂɨk ˈpjɛrtsɛ]) is a village in the administrative district of Gmina Boguty-Pianki, within Ostrów County, Masovian Voivodeship, in east-central Poland.
