= Kamieńczyk-Borowy =

- Village
- Location within Poland
- Coordinates: 52°43′10″N 22°22′23″E
- Country: Poland
- Voivodeship: Masovian
- County: Ostrów
- Gmina: Boguty-Pianki

Kamieńczyk-Borowy (Polish pronunciation: [kaˈmjɛj̃tʂɨk bɔˈrɔvɨ]) is a village in the administrative district of Gmina Boguty-Pianki, within Ostrów County, Masovian Voivodeship, in east-central Poland.
