= Białe-Papieże =

Village in Gmina Boguty-Pianki, Poland

- Village
- Location within Poland
- Coordinates: 52°46′03″N 22°20′37″E
- Country: Poland
- Voivodeship: Masovian
- County: Ostrów
- Gmina: Boguty-Pianki

Białe-Papieże [ˈbjawɛ paˈpjɛʐɛ] is a village in the administrative district of Gmina Boguty-Pianki, within Ostrów County, Masovian Voivodeship, in east-central Poland.
