= Tymianki-Moderki =

- Village
- Location within Poland
- Coordinates: 52°41′0″N 22°23′7″E
- Country: Poland
- Voivodeship: Masovian
- County: Ostrów
- Gmina: Boguty-Pianki
- Elevation: 125 m (410 ft)
- Population: 110

Tymianki-Moderki [tɨˈmjaŋki mɔˈdɛrki] is a village in the administrative district of Gmina Boguty-Pianki, within Ostrów County, Masovian Voivodeship, in east-central Poland.
