= Wróble =

Wróble may refer to several places:

- Wróble, Podlaskie Voivodeship
- Wróble, Warmian-Masurian Voivodeship
- Michałowo-Wróble

== See also ==
- Wróblewski
