= Kamieńczyk Wielki =

- Village
- Location within Poland
- Coordinates: 52°42′48″N 22°21′20″E
- Country: Poland
- Voivodeship: Masovian
- County: Ostrów
- Gmina: Boguty-Pianki

Kamieńczyk Wielki (Polish pronunciation: [kaˈmjɛj̃tʂɨk ˈfjɛlkʲi]) is a village in the administrative district of Gmina Boguty-Pianki, within Ostrów County, Masovian Voivodeship, in east-central Poland.
