= Kutyłowo-Bródki =

- Village
- Location within Poland
- Coordinates: 52°44′14″N 22°25′28″E
- Country: Poland
- Voivodeship: Masovian
- County: Ostrów
- Gmina: Boguty-Pianki

Kutyłowo-Bródki [kutɨˈwɔvɔ ˈbrutki] is a village in the administrative district of Gmina Boguty-Pianki, within Ostrów County, Masovian Voivodeship, in east-central Poland.
