= Boguty-Augustyny =

- Village
- Location within Poland
- Coordinates: 52°44′31″N 22°24′47″E
- Country: Poland
- Voivodeship: Masovian
- County: Ostrów
- Gmina: Boguty-Pianki
- Population: 50

Boguty-Augustyny [bɔˈɡutɨ auɡusˈtɨnɨ] is a village in the administrative district of Gmina Boguty-Pianki, within Ostrów County, Masovian Voivodeship, in east-central Poland.
