= Świerże-Leśniewek =

- Village
- Location within Poland
- Coordinates: 52°46′07″N 22°11′36″E
- Country: Poland
- Voivodeship: Masovian
- County: Ostrów
- Gmina: Szulborze Wielkie

Świerże-Leśniewek (Polish pronunciation: [ˈɕfjɛrʐɛ lɛɕˈɲɛvɛk]) is a village in the administrative district of Gmina Szulborze Wielkie, within Ostrów County, Masovian Voivodeship, in east-central Poland.
