= Mianówek =

- Village
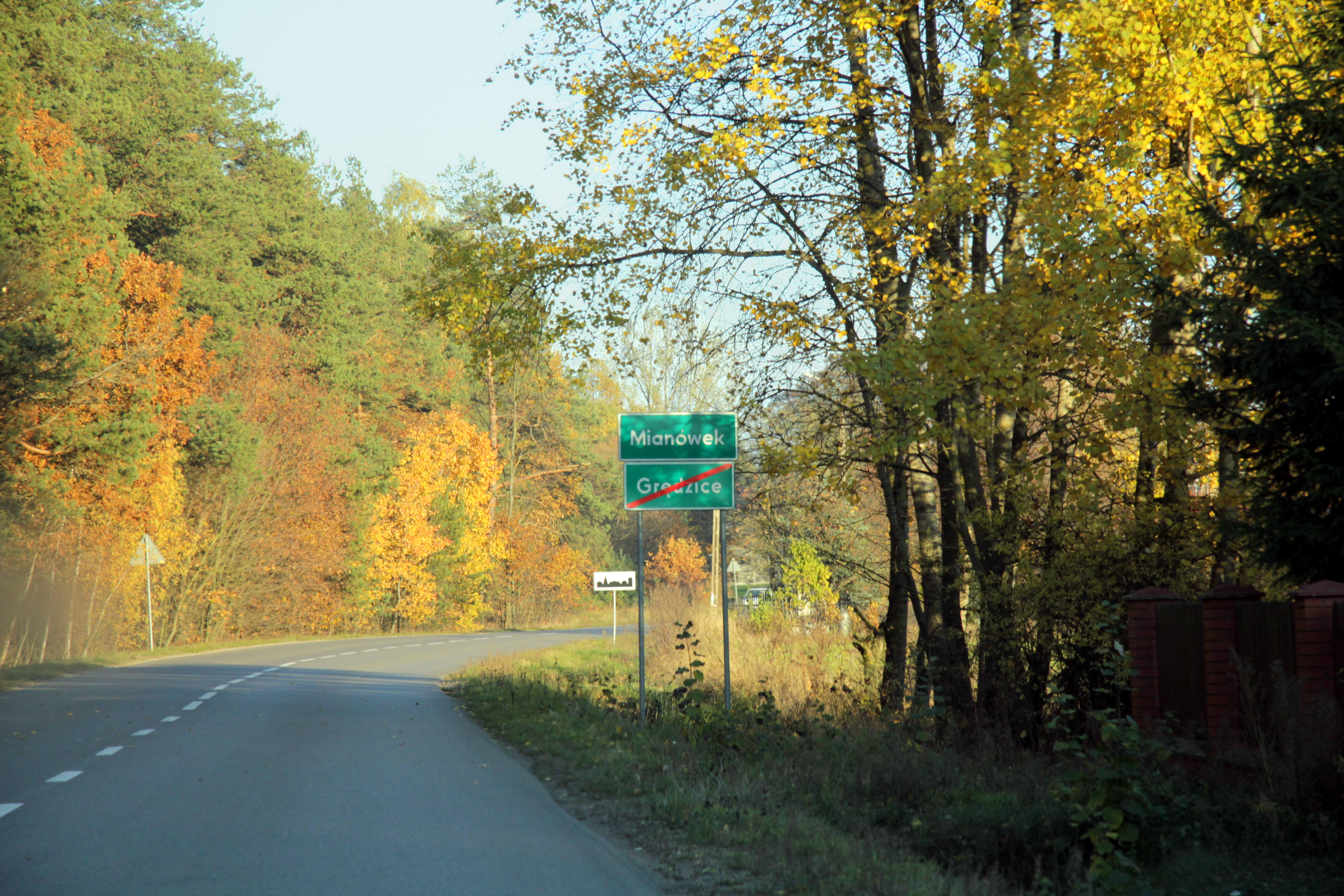

- Location within Poland
- Coordinates: 52°45′41″N 22°12′39″E
- Country: Poland
- Voivodeship: Masovian
- County: Ostrów
- Gmina: Szulborze Wielkie
- Population: 100

Mianówek [mjaˈnuvɛk] is a village in the administrative district of Gmina Szulborze Wielkie, within Ostrów County, Masovian Voivodeship, in east-central Poland.
