= Grądy, Gmina Wąsewo =

Grądy
- Village
- Location within Poland
- Coordinates: 52°50′04″N 21°45′00″E
- Country: Poland
- Voivodeship: Masovian
- County: Ostrów
- Gmina: Wąsewo
- Time zone: UTC+1 (CET)
  - Summer (DST): UTC+2 (CEST)
- Vehicle registration: WOR

Grądy [ˈɡrɔndɨ] is a village in the administrative district of Gmina Wąsewo, within Ostrów County, Masovian Voivodeship, in east-central Poland.

== History ==
In 1827, Grądy had a population of 99.

During the German occupation of Poland in World War II, from July 1941, the German government operated the Stalag 324 prisoner-of-war camp for Soviet POWs in the village. In January 1942, it was relocated to Łosośna (present-day district of Grodno).
