= Uścianek-Dębianka =

- Village
- Location within Poland
- Coordinates: 52°44′44″N 22°17′10″E
- Country: Poland
- Voivodeship: Masovian
- County: Ostrów
- Gmina: Szulborze Wielkie

Uścianek-Dębianka (Polish pronunciation: [uɕˈtɕanɛɡ dɛmˈbjaŋka]) is a village in the administrative district of Gmina Szulborze Wielkie, within Ostrów County, Masovian Voivodeship, in east-central Poland.
