= Króle =

Króle may refer to the following places:

- Króle, Masovian Voivodeship (east-central Poland)
- Króle, Warmian-Masurian Voivodeship (north Poland)
- Króle, West Pomeranian Voivodeship (north-west Poland)
