= Kunin =

Kunin may refer to:

== People ==
- Kunin (surname)
- Madeleine Kunin, former ambassador and Vermont governor

== Places ==
- Kunin (Poland)
- Kunín, Czech Republic
- Kunin, Lebanon
- Kunin, Lviv Oblast
- Kunin, Rivne Oblast

== See also ==
- Kunin-Zamek, a village in east-central Poland
