= Rząśnik Szlachecki =

- Village
- Location within Poland
- Coordinates: 52°51′3″N 21°42′46″E
- Country: Poland
- Voivodeship: Masovian
- County: Ostrów
- Gmina: Wąsewo

Rząśnik Szlachecki (Polish pronunciation: [ˈʐɔ̃ɕɲik ʂlaˈxɛtskʲi]) is a village in the administrative district of Gmina Wąsewo, within Ostrów County, Masovian Voivodeship, in east-central Poland.
