= Białe-Szczepanowice =

- Village
- Location within Poland
- Coordinates: 52°45′42″N 22°21′56″E
- Country: Poland
- Voivodeship: Masovian
- County: Ostrów
- Gmina: Boguty-Pianki

Białe-Szczepanowice [ˈbjawɛ ʂt͡ʂɛpanɔˈvit͡sɛ] is a village in the administrative district of Gmina Boguty-Pianki, within Ostrów County, Masovian Voivodeship, in east-central Poland.
