= Drewnowo-Konarze =

- Village
- Location within Poland
- Coordinates: 52°44′37″N 22°23′17″E
- Country: Poland
- Voivodeship: Masovian
- County: Ostrów
- Gmina: Boguty-Pianki
- Time zone: UTC+1 (CET)
  - Summer (DST): UTC+2 (CEST)
- Vehicle registration: WOR

Drewnowo-Konarze [drɛvˈnɔvɔ kɔˈnaʐɛ] is a village in the administrative district of Gmina Boguty-Pianki, within Ostrów County, Masovian Voivodeship, in east-central Poland.

== History ==
Drewnowo-Konarze along with Drewnowo-Gołyń, Drewnowo-Dmoszki, Drewnowo-Lipskie and Drewnowo-Ziemaki was a part of the okolica szlachecka of Drewnowo.
