= Cietrzewki-Warzyno =

- Village
- Location within Poland
- Coordinates: 52°42′15″N 22°23′07″E
- Country: Poland
- Voivodeship: Masovian
- County: Ostrów
- Gmina: Boguty-Pianki

Cietrzewki-Warzyno [t͡ɕɛˈtʂɛfki vaˈʐɨnɔ] is a village in the administrative district of Gmina Boguty-Pianki, within Ostrów County, Masovian Voivodeship, in east-central Poland.
