= Janczewo Wielkie =

- Village
- Location within Poland
- Coordinates: 52°45′24″N 22°14′46″E
- Country: Poland
- Voivodeship: Masovian
- County: Ostrów
- Gmina: Szulborze Wielkie

Janczewo Wielkie [janˈt͡ʂɛvɔ ˈvjɛlkʲɛ] is a village in the administrative district of Gmina Szulborze Wielkie, within Ostrów County, Masovian Voivodeship, in east-central Poland.
