= Zastawie, Masovian Voivodeship =

Zastawie
- Village
- Location within Poland
- Coordinates: 52°52′N 21°40′E
- Country: Poland
- Voivodeship: Masovian
- County: Ostrów
- Gmina: Wąsewo

Zastawie [zasˈtavjɛ] is a village in the administrative district of Gmina Wąsewo, within Ostrów County, Masovian Voivodeship, in east-central Poland.
