= Przeździecko-Grzymki =

- Village
- Location within Poland
- Coordinates: 52°51′16″N 22°13′41″E
- Country: Poland
- Voivodeship: Masovian
- County: Ostrów
- Gmina: Andrzejewo
- Population: 130

Przeździecko-Grzymki [pʂɛʑˈd͡ʑɛt͡skɔ ˈɡʐɨmki] is a village in the administrative district of Gmina Andrzejewo, within Ostrów County, Masovian Voivodeship, in east-central Poland.
