= Rososz, Gmina Wąsewo =

Rososz
- Village
- Location within Poland
- Coordinates: 52°54′24″N 21°39′19″E
- Country: Poland
- Voivodeship: Masovian
- County: Ostrów
- Gmina: Wąsewo

Rososz [ˈrɔsɔʂ] is a village in the administrative district of Gmina Wąsewo, within Ostrów County, Masovian Voivodeship, in east-central Poland.
