= Bojany =

- Village
- Location within Poland
- Coordinates: 52°41′N 21°47′E
- Country: Poland
- Voivodeship: Masovian
- County: Ostrów
- Gmina: Brok

Bojany [bɔˈjanɨ] is a village in the administrative district of Gmina Brok, within Ostrów County, Masovian Voivodeship, in east-central Poland.
