= Laskowizna, Gmina Brok =

Laskowizna
- Village
- Location within Poland
- Coordinates: 52°44′17″N 21°48′16″E
- Country: Poland
- Voivodeship: Masovian
- County: Ostrów
- Gmina: Brok

Laskowizna [laskɔˈvizna] is a village in the administrative district of Gmina Brok, within Ostrów County, Masovian Voivodeship, in east-central Poland.
