= Ludomir Benedyktowicz =

Polish artist (1844–1926)

Ludomir Ludwik Dominik
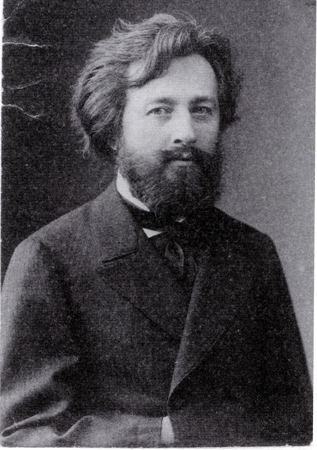
- Ludomir Benedyktowicz (date unknown)
- Born: August 15, 1844; Świniary
- Died: December 14, 1926 (aged 82); Lwów
- Occupations: landscape painter, soldier, writer, and amateur chess player

Ludomir Ludwik Dominik Benedyktowicz (15 August 1844 – 1/14 December 1926) was a Polish landscape painter, soldier, writer, and amateur chess player.

== Biography ==
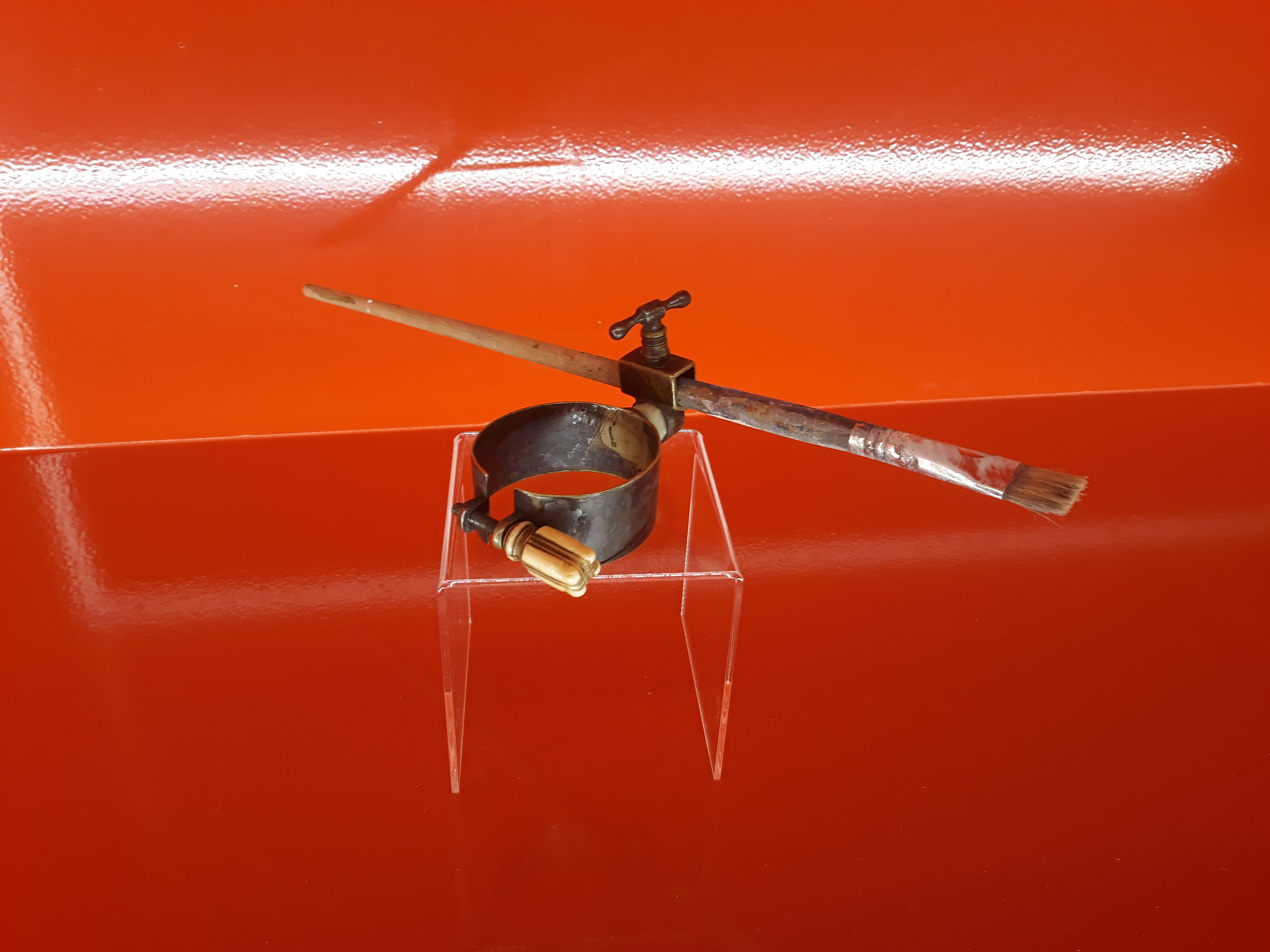
Prosthetic attachment made for Benedyktowicz to allow him to paint after his arm was amputated

He was born in Świniary. He attended primary school in Warsaw; then, in 1861, following in his father's footsteps, he went to the "Institute of Forest Management Practices" in Brok to study forestry with its founder, Professor Wojciech Jastrzębowski.

He interrupted his studies to join the January Uprising, becoming a fighter in a partisan unit commanded by Władysław Cichorski. During a skirmish with a Cossack unit near Stare Kaczkowo, his right hand was cut off by a sword and his left arm was shattered by a bullet. He was later evacuated to the rectory in Ostrów Mazowiecka, where his arm had to be amputated. It was no longer possible to study forestry, so he decided to study art, beginning at the Warsaw School of Drawing with Wojciech Gerson.

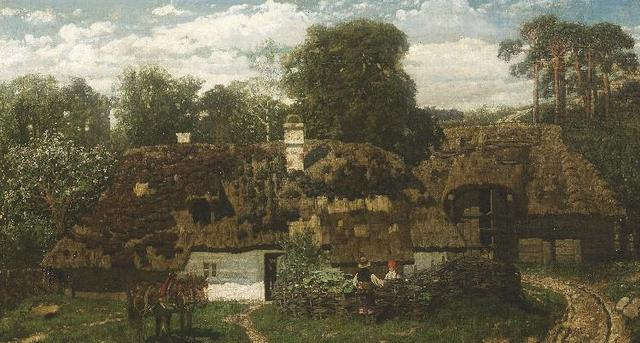
Rural Landscape

He painted with a metal ring of his own devising; attached to his right forearm, with screw-on clips to hold a brush, pen or piece of charcoal. Eventually, persecution of the uprising's participants intensified so, on the strength of his work with Gerson, he went to Munich and was allowed to enroll at the Academy of Fine Arts.

When he returned to Poland, he visited the gravesite of fellow insurgents who had been killed in the battle he survived. As a result, he was arrested on suspicion of "agitation" and briefly detained in the Warsaw Citadel.

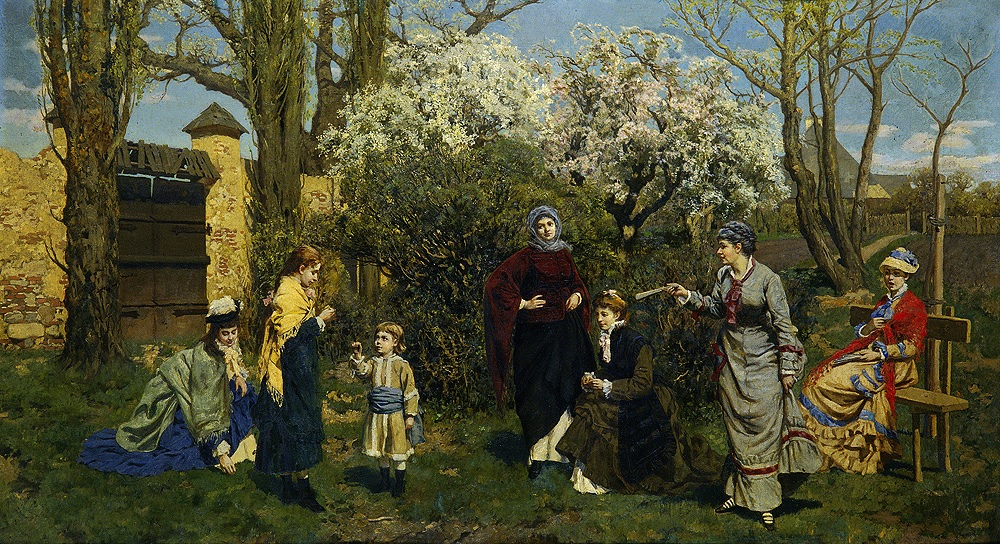
Gathering Violets

After being released for lack of evidence, he moved to Kraków, in the Austrian Partition, and studied composition with Jan Matejko. In 1876, he married and opened his own studio. He lived there for forty years, then moved to Lwów after the death of his wife and lived in a nursing home for veterans. During World War I, he served as a reserve Lieutenant and was awarded the Virtuti Militari.

In addition to his art, he produced three volumes of poetry; one each for the 40th, 50th, and 60th anniversaries of the January Uprising. He also wrote a book about Stanisław Witkiewicz (with whom he frequently argued) and his role as a critic. In 1893, as an amateur chess player, he was involved in the creation of the Kraków Chess Club, together with Hieronim Czarnowski, and served as its second President. In 1925, he was named an honorary member of "Hetman", a chess club in Lwów that included such notable players as Ignacy Popiel and Kalikst Morawski.

He died in 1926 in Lwów.

== Writings ==
- Stanisław Witkiewicz jako krytyk: jego pojęcia, zasady i teorye w malarstwie. Rozbiór krytyczny (Stanisław Witkiewicz as a critic...) Spólka Wydawnicza Polska, 1902 ("Nowa biblioteka uniwersalna" series) Full text @ Google Books.
