= Rząśnik-Majdan =

- Village
- Location within Poland
- Coordinates: 52°50′4″N 21°43′7″E
- Country: Poland
- Voivodeship: Masovian
- County: Ostrów
- Gmina: Wąsewo

Rząśnik-Majdan (Polish pronunciation: [ˈʐɔ̃ɕɲik ˈmajdan]) is a village in the administrative district of Gmina Wąsewo, within Ostrów County, Masovian Voivodeship, in east-central Poland.
