= Białe-Zieje =

Village in Gmina Boguty-Pianki, Poland

- Village
- Location within Poland
- Coordinates: 52°45′58″N 22°21′26″E
- Country: Poland
- Voivodeship: Masovian
- County: Ostrów
- Gmina: Boguty-Pianki
- Population: 24

Białe-Zieje [ˈbjawɛ ˈʑɛjɛ] is a village in the administrative district of Gmina Boguty-Pianki, within Ostrów County, Masovian Voivodeship, in east-central Poland.
