= Żebry-Laskowiec =

- Village
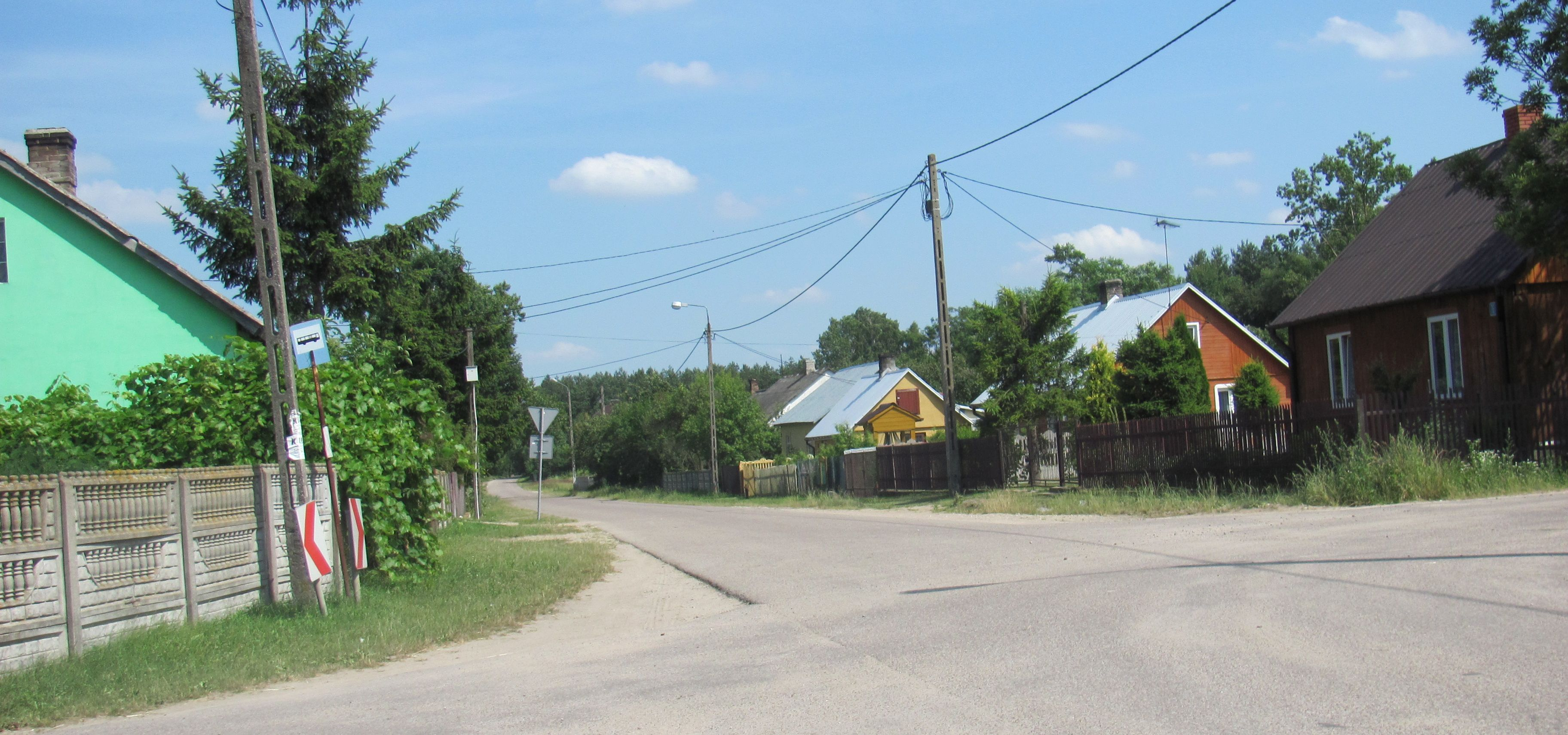

- Location within Poland
- Coordinates: 52°41′N 22°20′E
- Country: Poland
- Voivodeship: Masovian
- County: Ostrów
- Gmina: Nur
- Time zone: UTC+1 (CET)
  - Summer (DST): UTC+2 (CEST)

Żebry-Laskowiec [ˈʐɛbrɨ lasˈkɔvjɛt͡s] is a village in the administrative district of Gmina Nur, within Ostrów County, Masovian Voivodeship, in east-central Poland.

Eight Polish citizens were murdered by Nazi Germany in the village during World War II.
