= Trynisze-Kuniewo =

- Village
- Location within Poland
- Coordinates: 52°43′14″N 22°25′49″E
- Country: Poland
- Voivodeship: Masovian
- County: Ostrów
- Gmina: Boguty-Pianki

Trynisze-Kuniewo [trɨˈniʂɛ kuˈɲɛvɔ] is a village in the administrative district of Gmina Boguty-Pianki, within Ostrów County, Masovian Voivodeship, in east-central Poland.
