= Cempora =

- Village
- Location within Poland
- Coordinates: 52°37′06″N 22°25′31″E
- Country: Poland
- Voivodeship: Masovian
- County: Ostrów
- Gmina: Nur

Cempora [t͡sɛmˈpɔra] is a village in the administrative district of Gmina Nur, within Ostrów County, Masovian Voivodeship, in east-central Poland.
