= Tymianki-Szklarze =

- Village
- Location within Poland
- Coordinates: 52°41′11″N 22°24′26″E
- Country: Poland
- Voivodeship: Masovian
- County: Ostrów
- Gmina: Boguty-Pianki

Tymianki-Szklarze [tɨˈmjaŋki ˈʂklaʐɛ] is a village in the administrative district of Gmina Boguty-Pianki, in Ostrów County, Masovian Voivodeship, in east-central Poland.
