= Tymianki-Pachoły =

- Village
- Location within Poland
- Coordinates: 52°40′45″N 22°23′47″E
- Country: Poland
- Voivodeship: Masovian
- County: Ostrów
- Gmina: Boguty-Pianki

Tymianki-Pachoły [tɨˈmjaŋki paˈxɔwɨ] is a village in the administrative district of Gmina Boguty-Pianki, within Ostrów County, Masovian Voivodeship, in east-central Poland.
