= Króle Duże =

- Village
- Location within Poland
- Coordinates: 52°50′32″N 22°3′15″E
- Country: Poland
- Voivodeship: Masovian
- County: Ostrów
- Gmina: Andrzejewo
- Population: 420

Króle Duże [ˈkrulɛ ˈduʐɛ] is a village in the administrative district of Gmina Andrzejewo, within Ostrów County, Masovian Voivodeship, in east-central Poland.
