= Godlewo-Baćki =

- Village
- Location within Poland
- Coordinates: 52°47′18″N 22°25′04″E
- Country: Poland
- Voivodeship: Masovian
- County: Ostrów
- Gmina: Boguty-Pianki

Godlewo-Baćki [ɡɔdˈlɛvɔ ˈbat͡ɕki] is a village in the administrative district of Gmina Boguty-Pianki, within Ostrów County, Masovian Voivodeship, in East-Central Poland.
