= Janczewo-Sukmanki =

- Village
- Location within Poland
- Coordinates: 52°44′34″N 22°14′04″E
- Country: Poland
- Voivodeship: Masovian
- County: Ostrów
- Gmina: Szulborze Wielkie

Janczewo-Sukmanki [janˈt͡ʂɛvɔ sukˈmanki] is a village in the administrative district of Gmina Szulborze Wielkie, within Ostrów County, Masovian Voivodeship, in east-central Poland.
