= Pieńki Wielkie =

- Village
- Location within Poland
- Coordinates: 52°47′N 22°15′E
- Country: Poland
- Voivodeship: Masovian
- County: Ostrów
- Gmina: Andrzejewo
- Population: 110

Pieńki Wielkie [ˈpjɛɲki ˈvjɛlkʲɛ] is a village in the administrative district of Gmina Andrzejewo, within Ostrów County, Masovian Voivodeship, in east-central Poland.
