= Gołębie-Leśniewo =

- Village
- Location within Poland
- Coordinates: 52°47′53″N 22°10′37″E
- Country: Poland
- Voivodeship: Masovian
- County: Ostrów
- Gmina: Andrzejewo
- Population: 100

Gołębie-Leśniewo [ɡɔˈwɛmbjɛ lɛɕˈɲɛvɔ] is a village in the administrative district of Gmina Andrzejewo, within Ostrów County, Masovian Voivodeship, in east-central Poland.
