= Godlewo Wielkie =

- Village
- Location within Poland
- Coordinates: 52°44′15″N 22°18′38″E
- Country: Poland
- Voivodeship: Masovian
- County: Ostrów
- Gmina: Nur

Godlewo Wielkie [ɡɔdˈlɛvɔ ˈvjɛlkʲɛ] is a village in the administrative district of Gmina Nur, within Ostrów County, Masovian Voivodeship, in east-central Poland.
