= Drewnowo-Gołyń =

- Village
- Location within Poland
- Coordinates: 52°45′34″N 22°23′40″E
- Country: Poland
- Voivodeship: Masovian
- County: Ostrów
- Gmina: Boguty-Pianki
- Time zone: UTC+1 (CET)
  - Summer (DST): UTC+2 (CEST)
- Vehicle registration: WOR

Drewnowo-Gołyń [drɛvˈnɔvɔ ˈɡɔwɨɲ] is a village in the administrative district of Gmina Boguty-Pianki, within Ostrów County, Masovian Voivodeship, in east-central Poland.

== History ==
Drewnowo-Gołyń along with Drewnowo-Dmoszki, Drewnowo-Konarze, Drewnowo-Lipskie and Drewnowo-Ziemaki was a part of the okolica szlachecka of Drewnowo.

During the German occupation of Poland (World War II), on 11 September 1943, the German gendarmerie committed a massacre of nine Poles, accused of sheltering partisans (see also Nazi crimes against the Polish nation).
