= Kałęczyn, Gmina Nur =

Kałęczyn
- Village
- Location within Poland
- Coordinates: 52°42′51″N 22°16′25″E
- Country: Poland
- Voivodeship: Masovian
- County: Ostrów
- Gmina: Nur

Kałęczyn [kaˈwɛnt͡ʂɨn] is a village in the administrative district of Gmina Nur, within Ostrów County, Masovian Voivodeship, in east-central Poland.
