= Godlewo-Gorzejewo =

- Village
- Location within Poland
- Coordinates: 52°47′48″N 22°11′20″E
- Country: Poland
- Voivodeship: Masovian
- County: Ostrów
- Gmina: Andrzejewo
- Population: 60

Godlewo-Gorzejewo [ɡɔdˈlɛvɔ ɡɔʐɛˈjɛvɔ] is a village in the administrative district of Gmina Andrzejewo, within Ostrów County, Masovian Voivodeship, in east-central Poland.
