= Gmina Nur =

Gmina Nur Nur Commune
- Gmina
- Flag Coat of arms
- Interactive map of Gmina Nur
- Coordinates (Nur): 52°40′5″N 22°18′56″E
- Country: Poland
- Voivodeship: Masovian
- County: Ostrów
- Seat: Nur

Area
  - Total: 102.85 km^{2} (39.71 sq mi)

Population (2013)
  - Total: 2,934
  - Density: 28.53/km^{2} (73.88/sq mi)
- Website: http://www.gminanur.pl/

Gmina Nur is a rural gmina (administrative district) in Ostrów County, Masovian Voivodeship, in east-central Poland. Its seat is the village of Nur, which lies approximately 32 kilometres (20 mi) south-east of Ostrów Mazowiecka and 103 km (64 mi) north-east of Warsaw.

The gmina covers an area of 102.85 square kilometres (39.7 sq mi), and as of 2006 its total population is 3,191 (2,934 in 2013).

== Villages ==
Gmina Nur contains the villages and settlements of Bochna, Cempora, Godlewo Mierniki, Godlewo Milewek, Godlewo Warsze, Godlewo Wielkie, Kałęczyn, Kamianka, Kossaki, Kramkowo Lipskie, Łęg Nurski, Murawskie Nadbużne, Myślibory, Nur, Nur-Kolonia Wschodnia, Obryte, Ołowskie, Ołtarze Gołacze, Ślepowrony, Strękowo, Strękowo-Nieczykowskie, Zakrzewo Słomy, Zaszków, Zaszków Kolonia, Żebry Kolonia, Żebry-Laskowiec and Zuzela.

== Neighbouring gminas ==
Gmina Nur is bordered by the gminas of Boguty-Pianki, Ceranów, Ciechanowiec, Czyżew-Osada, Sterdyń, Szulborze Wielkie and Zaręby Kościelne.
