= Boguty-Pianki =

- Village
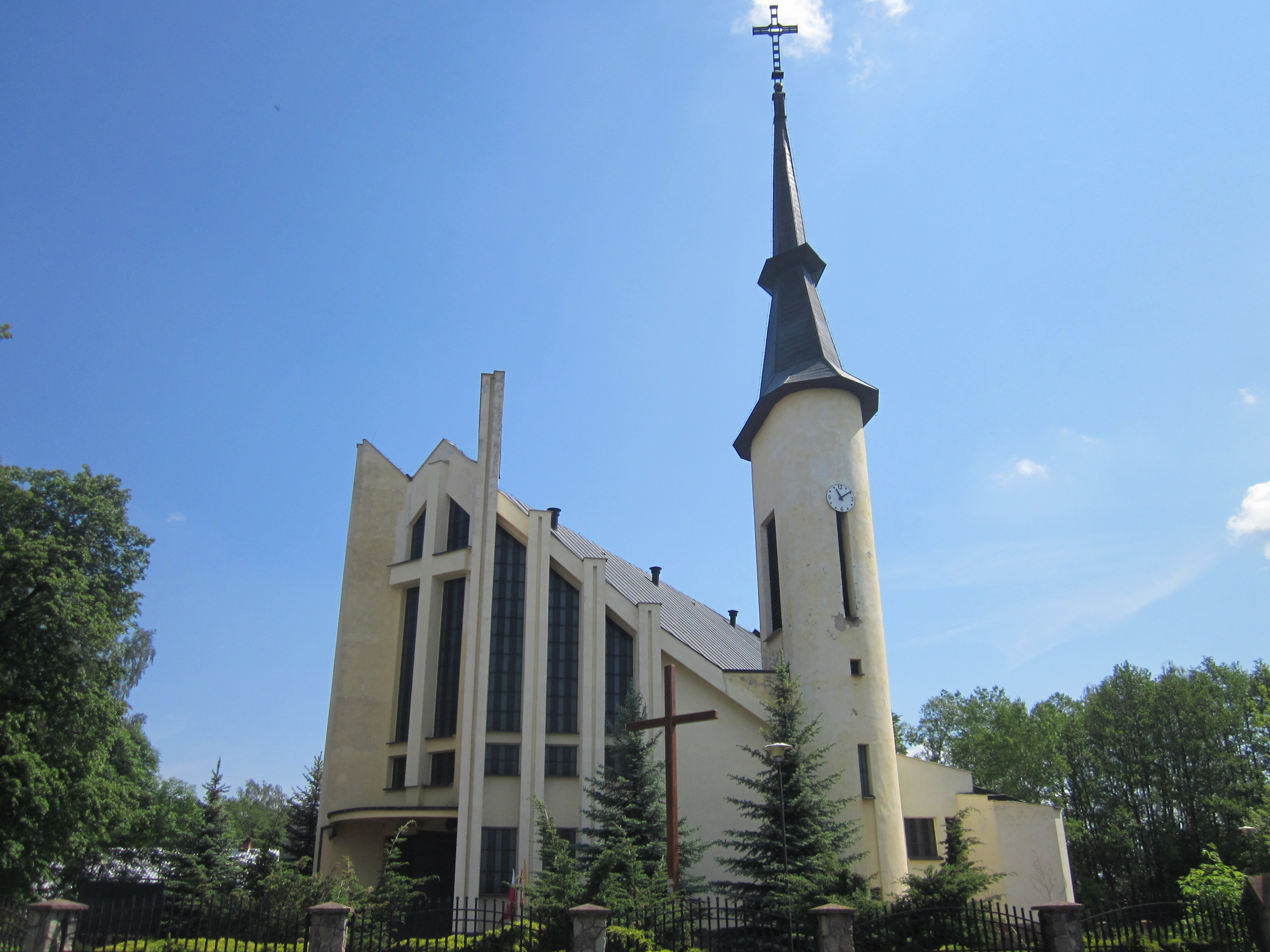
- All Saints church in Boguty-Pianki

- Location within Poland
- Coordinates: 52°44′N 22°25′E
- Country: Poland
- Voivodeship: Masovian
- County: Ostrów
- Gmina: Boguty-Pianki
- Time zone: UTC+1 (CET)
  - Summer (DST): UTC+2 (CEST)
- Vehicle registration: WOR

Boguty-Pianki [bɔˈɡutɨ ˈpjanki] is a village in Ostrów County, Masovian Voivodeship, in east-central Poland. It is the seat of the gmina (administrative district) called Gmina Boguty-Pianki.

Nine Polish citizens were murdered by Nazi Germany in the village during World War II.
