= Szulborze Wielkie =

- Village
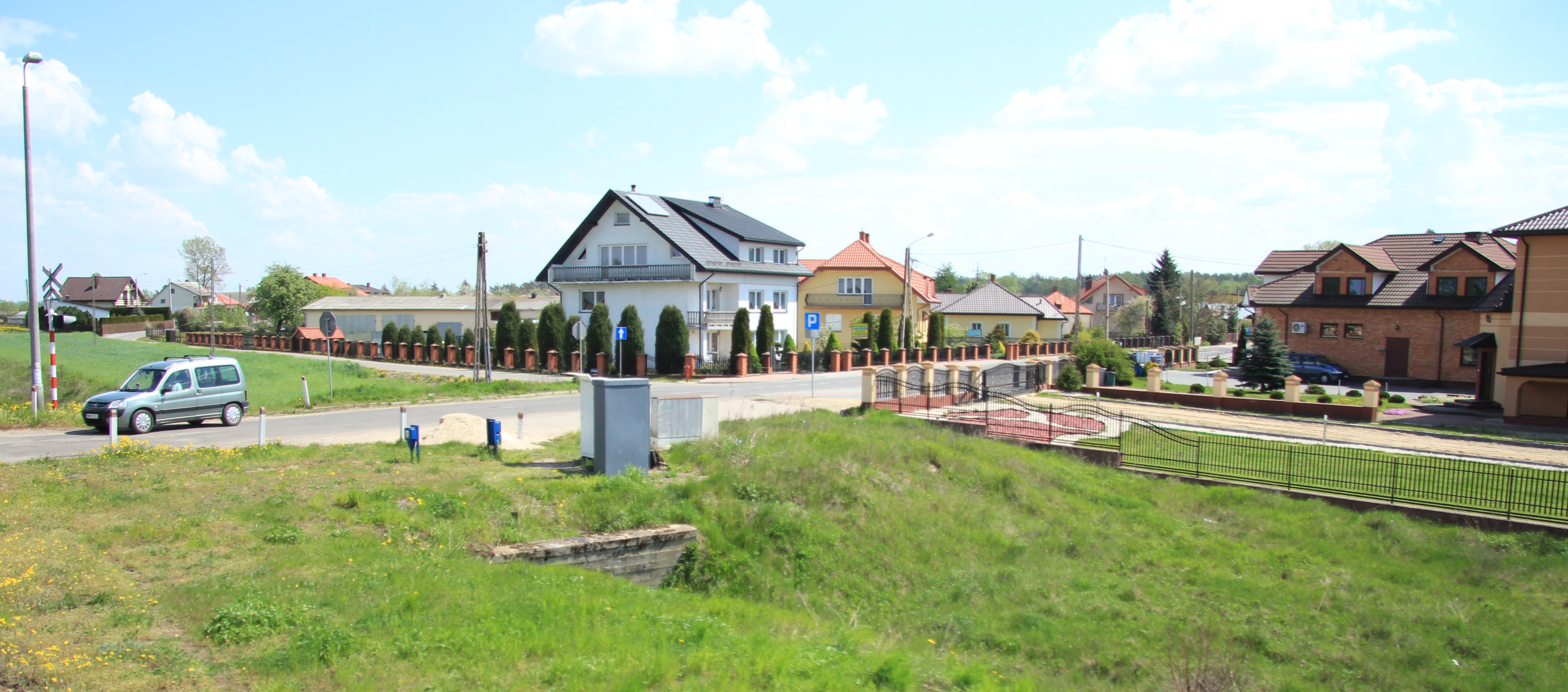

- Location within Poland
- Coordinates: 52°46′N 22°14′E
- Country: Poland
- Voivodeship: Masovian
- County: Ostrów
- Gmina: Szulborze Wielkie

Szulborze Wielkie [ʂulˈbɔʐɛ ˈvjɛlkʲɛ] is a village in Ostrów County, Masovian Voivodeship, in east-central Poland. It is the seat of the gmina (administrative district) called Gmina Szulborze Wielkie.
