= Króle, Masovian Voivodeship =

Króle
- Village
- Location within Poland
- Coordinates: 52°52′09″N 21°38′06″E
- Country: Poland
- Voivodeship: Masovian
- County: Ostrów
- Gmina: Wąsewo

Króle [ˈkrulɛ] is a village in the administrative district of Gmina Wąsewo, within Ostrów County, Masovian Voivodeship, in east-central Poland.
