= Andrzejewo, Masovian Voivodeship =

Andrzejewo
- Village
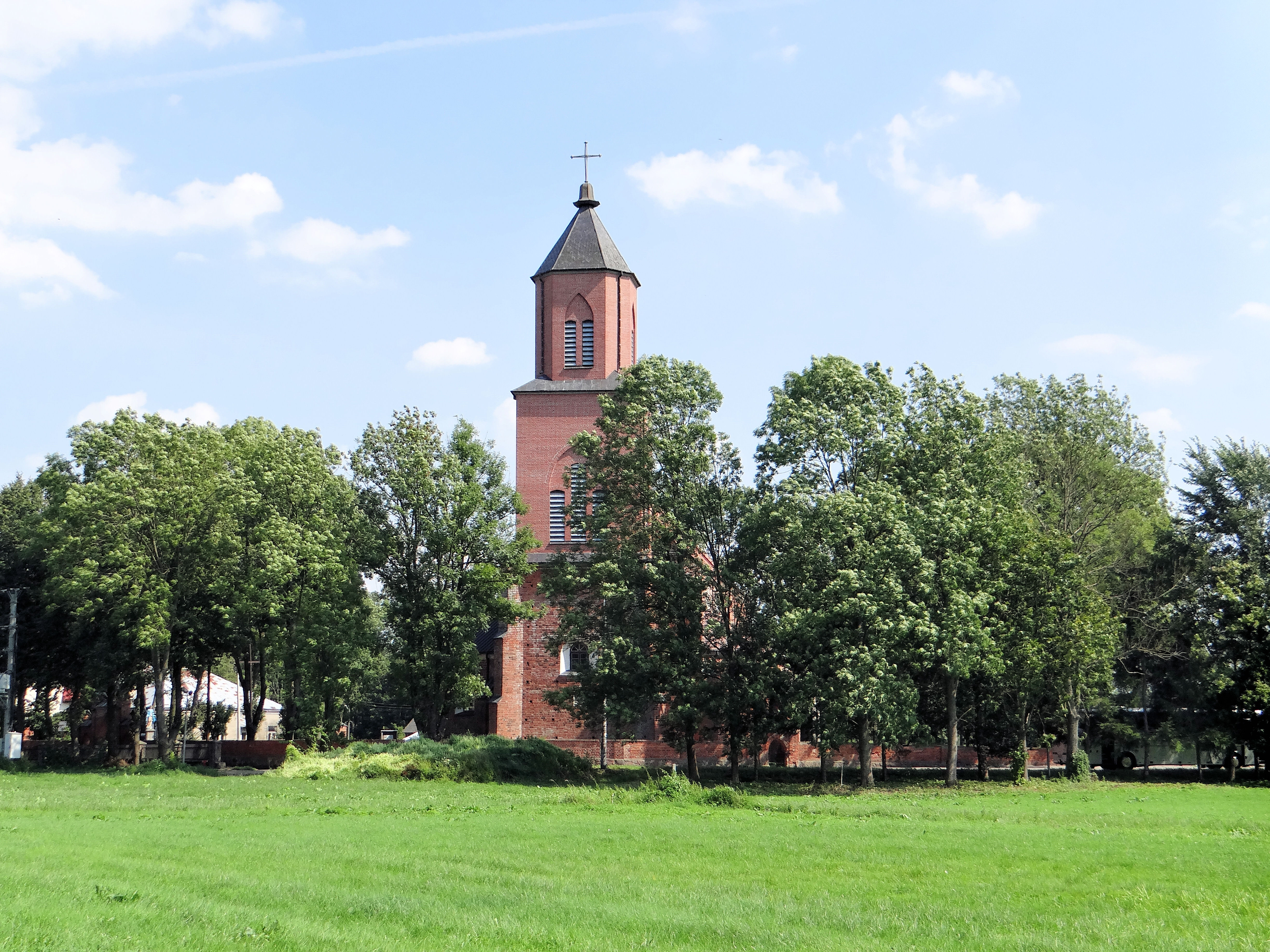
- Church of Saint Bartholomew

- Location within Poland
- Coordinates: 52°49′50″N 22°12′6″E
- Country: Poland
- Voivodeship: Masovian
- County: Ostrów
- Gmina: Andrzejewo
- Founded: 1528
- Founder: Andrzej Krzycki

Population
  - Total: 1,000
- Time zone: UTC+1 (CET)
  - Summer (DST): UTC+2 (CEST)

Andrzejewo [andʐɛˈjɛvɔ] is a village in Ostrów County, Masovian Voivodeship, in east-central Poland. It is the seat of the gmina (administrative district) called Gmina Andrzejewo.

Andrzejewo was founded by Andrzej Krzycki and granted town rights by King Sigismund I the Old in 1528.
