= Gmina Brok =

Gmina Brok Brok Commune
- Gmina
- Coat of arms
- Interactive map of Gmina Brok
- Coordinates (Brok): 52°42′N 21°51′E
- Country: Poland
- Voivodeship: Masovian
- County: Ostrów
- Seat: Brok

Area
  - Total: 110.21 km^{2} (42.55 sq mi)

Population (2013)
  - Total: 2,921
  - Density: 26.50/km^{2} (68.64/sq mi)
  - Urban: 1,977
  - Rural: 944
- Website: http://www.brok.pl/

Gmina Brok is an urban-rural gmina (administrative district) in Ostrów County, Masovian Voivodeship, in east-central Poland. Its seat is the town of Brok, which lies approximately 12 kilometres (7 mi) south of Ostrów Mazowiecka and 79 km (49 mi) north-east of Warsaw.

The gmina covers an area of 110.21 square kilometres (42.6 sq mi), and as of 2006 its total population is 2,843, of which the population of Brok is 1,859, and the population of the rural part of the gmina is 984.

== Villages ==
Apart from the town of Brok, Gmina Brok contains the villages and settlements of Bojany, Laskowizna, Nowe Kaczkowo, Puzdrowizna and Stare Kaczkowo.

== Neighbouring gminas ==
Gmina Brok is bordered by the gminas of Brańszczyk, Małkinia Górna, Ostrów Mazowiecka and Sadowne.
