= Gmina Wąsewo =

Gmina Wąsewo Wąsewo Commune
- Gmina
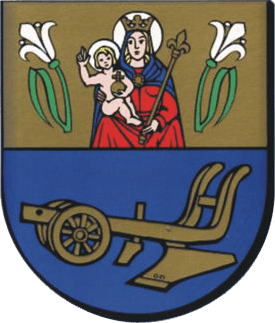
- Coat of arms
- Interactive map of Gmina Wąsewo
- Coordinates (Wąsewo): 52°53′N 21°40′E
- Country: Poland
- Voivodeship: Masovian
- County: Ostrów
- Seat: Wąsewo

Area
  - Total: 119.2 km^{2} (46.0 sq mi)

Population (2013)
  - Total: 4,476
  - Density: 37.55/km^{2} (97.25/sq mi)
- Website: http://www.wasewo.pl

Gmina Wąsewo is a rural gmina (administrative district) in Ostrów County, Masovian Voivodeship, in east-central Poland. Its seat is the village of Wąsewo, which lies approximately 17 kilometres (10 mi) north-west of Ostrów Mazowiecka and 85 km (52 mi) north-east of Warsaw.

The gmina covers an area of 119.2 square kilometres (46.0 sq mi), and as of 2006 its total population is 4,582 (4,476 in 2013).

== Villages ==
Gmina Wąsewo contains the villages and settlements of Bagatele, Bartosy, Brudki Nowe, Brudki Stare, Brzezienko, Choiny, Czesin, Dalekie, Grądy, Grębki, Jarząbka, Króle, Majdan Suski, Mokrylas, Przedświt, Przyborowie, Rososz, Ruda, Rynek, Rząśnik Szlachecki, Rząśnik Włościański, Rząśnik-Majdan, Trynosy, Ulasek, Wąsewo, Wąsewo-Kolonia, Wąsewo-Lachowiec, Wysocze, Zastawie and Zgorzałowo.

== Neighbouring gminas ==
Gmina Wąsewo is bordered by the gminas of Czerwin, Długosiodło, Goworowo and Ostrów Mazowiecka.
