= Gmina Szulborze Wielkie =

Gmina Szulborze Wielkie Szulborze Wielkie Commune
- Gmina
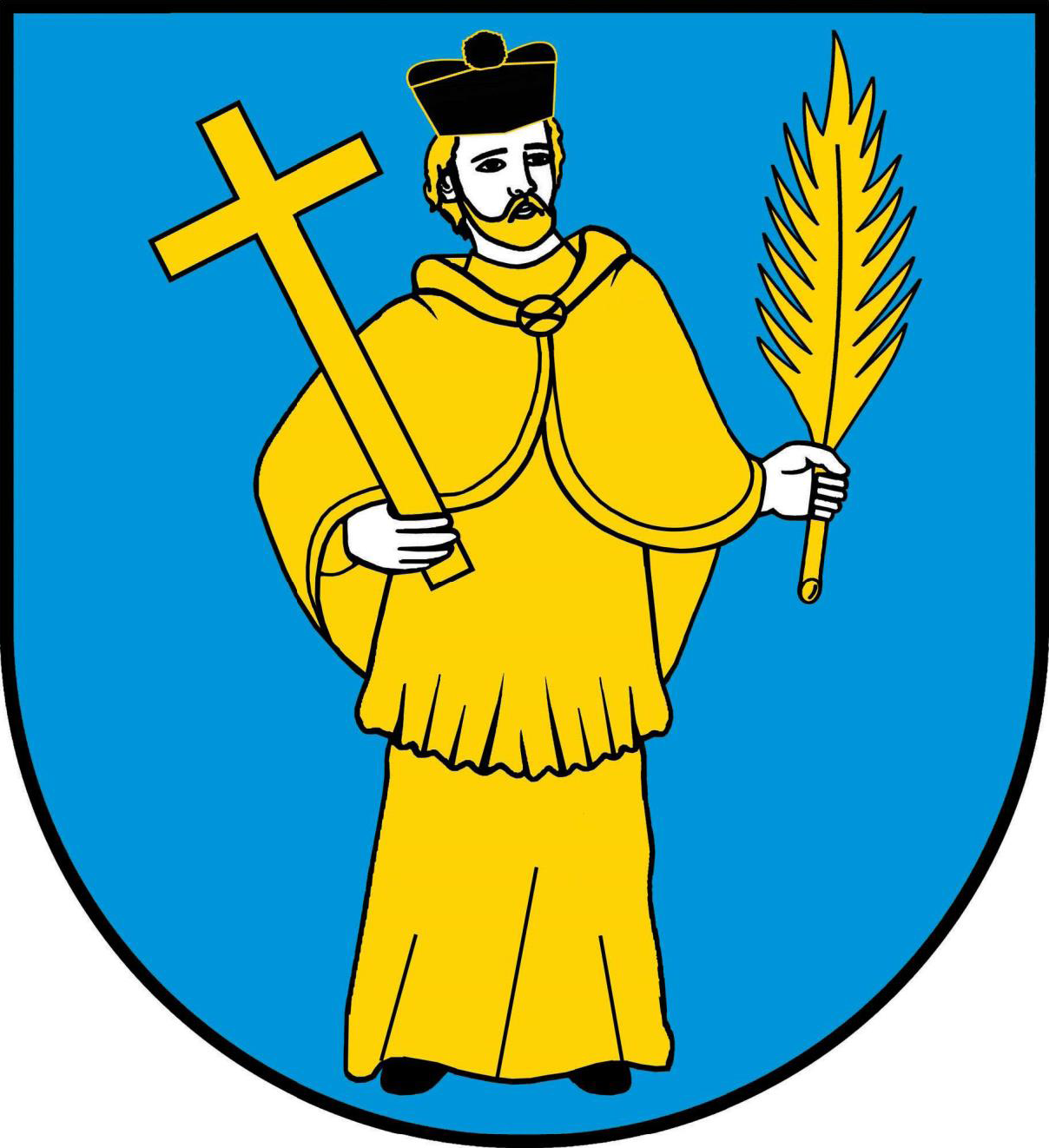
- Coat of arms
- Interactive map of Gmina Szulborze Wielkie
- Coordinates (Szulborze Wielkie): 52°46′N 22°14′E
- Country: Poland
- Voivodeship: Masovian
- County: Ostrów
- Seat: Szulborze Wielkie

Area
  - Total: 46.71 km^{2} (18.03 sq mi)

Population (2013)
  - Total: 1,798
  - Density: 38.49/km^{2} (99.70/sq mi)
- Website: http://www.szulborze-wielkie.bazagmin.pl

Gmina Szulborze Wielkie is a rural gmina (administrative district) in Ostrów County, Masovian Voivodeship, in east-central Poland. Its seat is the village of Szulborze Wielkie, which lies approximately 23 kilometres (14 mi) east of Ostrów Mazowiecka and 104 km (65 mi) north-east of Warsaw.

The gmina covers an area of 46.71 square kilometres (18.0 sq mi), and as of 2006 its total population is 1,824 (1,798 in 2013).

== Villages ==
Gmina Szulborze Wielkie contains the villages and settlements of Brulino-Lipskie, Godlewo-Gudosze, Gostkowo, Grędzice, Helenowo, Janczewo Wielkie, Janczewo-Sukmanki, Leśniewo, Mianówek, Słup-Kolonia, Smolewo-Parcele, Smolewo-Wieś, Świerże-Leśniewek, Szulborze Wielkie, Uścianek-Dębianka and Zakrzewo-Zalesie.

== Neighbouring gminas ==
Gmina Szulborze Wielkie is bordered by the gminas of Andrzejewo, Czyżew-Osada, Nur and Zaręby Kościelne.
