= Wąsewo, Masovian Voivodeship =

Wąsewo
- Village
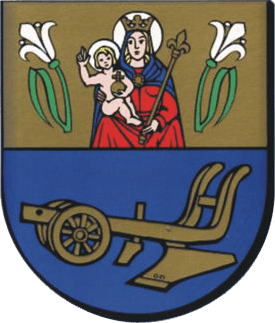
- Coat of arms

- Location within Poland
- Coordinates: 52°53′N 21°40′E
- Country: Poland
- Voivodeship: Masovian
- County: Ostrów
- Gmina: Wąsewo
- Population: 780
- Time zone: UTC+1 (CET)
  - Summer (DST): UTC+2 (CEST)
- Vehicle registration: WOR
- Website: http://www.wasewo.pl

Wąsewo [vɔ̃ˈsɛvɔ] is a village in Ostrów County, Masovian Voivodeship, in east-central Poland. It is the seat of the gmina (administrative district) called Gmina Wąsewo.

== History ==
During the German occupation of Poland (World War II), various Polish underground resistance organizations were formed in the area by late 1939. The organizations were soon unified into a district of the Home Army under the cryptonym "Opocznik" ("wheatear") by Major Eugeniusz Mieszkowski nom de guerre Ostry. It covered the former Ostrów County, and was divided into five centers, one of which was located in Wąsewo.
