= Gmina Boguty-Pianki =

Gmina Boguty-Pianki Boguty-Pianki Commune
- Gmina
- Interactive map of Gmina Boguty-Pianki
- Coordinates (Boguty-Pianki): 52°44′N 22°25′E
- Country: Poland
- Voivodeship: Masovian
- County: Ostrów
- Seat: Boguty-Pianki

Area
  - Total: 89.13 km^{2} (34.41 sq mi)

Population (2013)
  - Total: 2,761
  - Density: 30.98/km^{2} (80.23/sq mi)

Gmina Boguty-Pianki is a rural gmina (administrative district) in Ostrów County, Masovian Voivodeship, in east-central Poland. Its seat is the village of Boguty-Pianki, which lies approximately 36 kilometres (22 mi) east of Ostrów Mazowiecka and 112 km (70 mi) north-east of Warsaw.

The gmina covers an area of 89.13 square kilometres (34.4 sq mi), and as of 2006 its total population is 2,900 (2,761 in 2013).

== Villages ==
Gmina Boguty-Pianki contains the villages and settlements of:

- Biale-Chorosze
- Biale-Figle
- Biale-Giezki
- Biale-Kwaczoly
- Biale-Misztale
- Biale-Papieze
- Biale-Szczepanowice
- Biale-Zieje
- Boguty-Augustyny
- Boguty-Lesne
- Boguty-Milczki
- Boguty-Pianki
- Boguty-Rubiesze
- Cietrzewki-Warzyno
- Drewnowo-Dmoszki
- Drewnowo-Golyn
- Drewnowo-Konarze
- Drewnowo-Lipskie
- Drewnowo-Ziemaki
- Godlewo-Backi
- Godlewo-Luby
- Kamienczyk Wielki
- Kamienczyk-Borowy
- Kamienczyk-Pierce
- Kamienczyk-Ryciorki
- Kraszewo-Czarne
- Kunin-Zamek
- Kutyłowo-Bródki
- Kutylowo-Perysie
- Michałowo-Wróble
- Murawskie-Czachy
- Murawskie-Miazgi
- Szpice-Chojnowo
- Trynisze-Kuniewo
- Trynisze-Moszewo
- Tymianki-Adamy
- Tymianki-Bucie
- Tymianki-Debosze
- Tymianki-Moderki
- Tymianki-Okunie
- Tymianki-Pacholy
- Tymianki-Skóry
- Tymianki-Szklarze
- Zabiele-Pikuly
- Zawisty-Dworaki
- Zawisty-Króle
- Zawisty-Kruki
- Zawisty-Piotrowice
- Zawisty-Wity
- Zlotki-Przeczki
- Zlotki-Pulapki
- Zlotki-Starowies

== Neighbouring gminas ==
Gmina Boguty-Pianki is bordered by the gminas of Ciechanowiec, Czyżew-Osada, Klukowo and Nur.
