= Gmina Andrzejewo =

Gmina Andrzejewo Andrzejewo Commune
- Gmina
- Flag Coat of arms
- Interactive map of Gmina Andrzejewo
- Coordinates (Andrzejewo): 52°49′50″N 22°12′6″E
- Country: Poland
- Voivodeship: Masovian
- County: Ostrów
- Seat: Andrzejewo

Area
  - Total: 118.64 km^{2} (45.81 sq mi)

Population (2013)
  - Total: 4,318
  - Density: 36.40/km^{2} (94.26/sq mi)
- Website: http://www.andrzejewo.info/

Gmina Andrzejewo is a rural gmina (administrative district) in Ostrów County, Masovian Voivodeship, in east-central Poland. Its seat is the village of Andrzejewo, which lies approximately 21 kilometres (13 mi) east of Ostrów Mazowiecka and 107 km (66 mi) north-east of Warsaw.

The gmina covers an area of 118.64 square kilometres (45.8 sq mi), and as of 2006 its total population is 4,467 (4,318 in 2013).

== Villages ==
Gmina Andrzejewo contains the villages and settlements of Andrzejewo, Dąbrowa, Godlewo-Gorzejewo, Gołębie-Leśniewo, Janowo, Jasienica-Parcele, Kowalówka, Króle Duże, Króle Małe, Kuleszki-Nienałty, Łętownica-Parcele, Mianowo, Nowa Ruskołęka, Ołdaki-Polonia, Olszewo-Cechny, Pęchratka Mała, Pieńki Wielkie, Pieńki-Sobótki, Pieńki-Żaki, Przeździecko-Dworaki, Przeździecko-Grzymki, Przeździecko-Jachy, Przeździecko-Lenarty, Ruskołęka-Parcele, Stara Ruskołęka, Załuski-Lipniewo, Zaręby-Bolędy, Zaręby-Choromany, Zaręby-Warchoły and Żelazy-Brokowo.

== Neighbouring gminas ==
Gmina Andrzejewo is bordered by the gminas of Czyżew-Osada, Ostrów Mazowiecka, Szulborze Wielkie, Szumowo, Zambrów and Zaręby Kościelne.
