= Occupation of Poland (disambiguation) =

Occupation of Poland may refer to:

- Partitions of Poland (1795-1914)
- The German Government General of Warsaw and the Austrian Military Government of Lublin during World War I
- Occupation of Poland (1939–1945) during World War II
- Soviet influence over Poland after World War II (1945-1989)
- Soviet occupation of Poland (disambiguation)
