= Stare Kaczkowo =

- Village
- Location within Poland
- Coordinates: 52°44′N 21°56′E
- Country: Poland
- Voivodeship: Masovian
- County: Ostrów
- Gmina: Brok

Stare Kaczkowo [ˈstarɛ kat͡ʂˈkɔvɔ] is a village in the administrative district of Gmina Brok, within Ostrów County, Masovian Voivodeship, in east-central Poland.
