= Kunin-Zamek =

- Village
- Location within Poland
- Coordinates: 52°42′09″N 22°20′13″E
- Country: Poland
- Voivodeship: Masovian
- County: Ostrów
- Gmina: Boguty-Pianki
- Population: 100

Kunin-Zamek [ˈkunin ˈzamɛk] is a village in the administrative district of Gmina Boguty-Pianki, within Ostrów County, Masovian Voivodeship, in east-central Poland.
