= Soviet occupation of Poland =

Soviet occupation of Poland may refer to:

- Occupation of Poland (1939–45), by Nazi Germany and the Soviet Union
  - Territories of Poland annexed by the Soviet Union
  - Soviet annexation of Eastern Galicia and Volhynia
- Polish People's Republic, heavily dominated by Soviet influence
  - History of Poland (1945–1989)

== See also ==
- Occupation of Poland (disambiguation)
