= Ostrów County, Masovian Voivodeship =

Ostrów County Powiat ostrowski
- County
- Flag Coat of arms

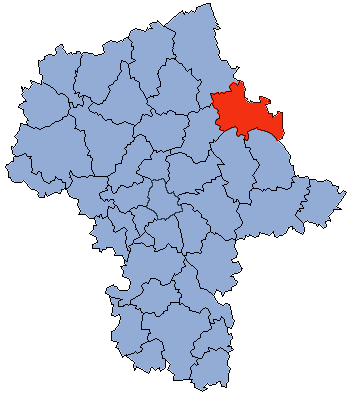
- Location within the voivodeship

- Division into gminas
- Coordinates (Ostrów Mazowiecka): 52°48′N 21°54′E
- Country: Poland
- Voivodeship: Masovian
- Seat: Ostrów Mazowiecka
- Gminas: Total 11 (incl. 1 urban): Ostrów Mazowiecka; Gmina Andrzejewo; Gmina Boguty-Pianki; Gmina Brok; Gmina Małkinia Górna; Gmina Nur; Gmina Ostrów Mazowiecka; Gmina Stary Lubotyń; Gmina Szulborze Wielkie; Gmina Wąsewo; Gmina Zaręby Kościelne

Area
  - Total: 1,218.06 km^{2} (470.30 sq mi)

Population (2019)
  - Total: 72,558
  - Density: 59.568/km^{2} (154.28/sq mi)
  - Urban: 24,430
  - Rural: 48,128
- Car plates: WOR
- Website: www.powiatostrowmaz.pl

Ostrów County (Polish: powiat ostrowski) is a county in Masovian Voivodeship, east-central Poland. Its seat is located in the town of Ostrów Mazowiecka, with the other towns of the county being Małkinia Górna and Brok. The county was established on 1 January 1999, and historically existed from 1919 to 1939 in the Białystok Voivodeship, Second Polish Republic, and in 1939, in the Warsaw Voivodeship.

The county covers an area of 1,218.06 square kilometres (470.3 sq mi). As of 2019, its total population is 72,558, out of which the population of Ostrów Mazowiecka is 22,489, that of Małkinia Górna is 4,834 and Brok 1,941, and the rural population is 48,128.

== Neighbouring counties ==
Ostrów County is bordered by Łomża County to the north, Zambrów County to the north-east, Wysokie Mazowieckie County to the east, Sokołów County and Węgrów County to the south, Wyszków County to the south-west, and Ostrołęka County to the north-west.

== Administrative divisions ==
The county is subdivided into 11 gminas (one urban, two urban-rural and eight rural). These are listed in the following table, in descending order of population.

Gmina	Type	Area (km^{2})	Population (2019)	Seat
Ostrów Mazowiecka	urban	22.1	22,489	
Gmina Ostrów Mazowiecka	rural	283.7	12,885	Ostrów Mazowiecka *
Gmina Małkinia Górna	urban-rural	134.1	11,617	Małkinia Górna
Gmina Wąsewo	rural	119.2	4,317	Wąsewo
Gmina Andrzejewo	rural	118.6	4,094	Andrzejewo
Gmina Stary Lubotyń	rural	109.2	3,724	Stary Lubotyń
Gmina Zaręby Kościelne	rural	88.9	3,660	Zaręby Kościelne
Gmina Brok	urban-rural	110.2	2,840	Brok
Gmina Nur	rural	102.9	2,670	Nur
Gmina Boguty-Pianki	rural	89.1	2,594	Boguty-Pianki
Gmina Szulborze Wielkie	rural	46.7	1,668	Szulborze Wielkie
* seat not part of the gmina
