= Kosuty =

Kosuty may refer to:

- Košúty, Slovakia
- Košúty, Martin, Slovakia
- Kosuty, Lublin Voivodeship, east Poland
- Kosuty, Masovian Voivodeship, east-central Poland
