= Pałapus =

- Village
- Location within Poland
- Coordinates: 52°52′08.04″N 21°56′07.08″E
- Country: Poland
- Voivodeship: Masovian
- County: Ostrów
- Gmina: Ostrów Mazowiecka

Pałapus – village in Poland, Masovian voivodeship, Ostrów County, in Gmina Ostrów Mazowiecka.

Place was created 1 January 2013 from a combination of villages Pałapus Szlachecki and Pałapus Włościański.
