= Kossuth =

Kossuth may refer to:

== Places ==
=== Hungary ===
- Kossuth tér, or Lajos Kossuth Square, Budapest
- Kossuth Lajos tér (Budapest Metro), a station on the M2 (East–West) line of the Budapest Metro

=== United States ===
- Kossuth, Indiana, an unincorporated place in Washington County, Indiana
- Kossuth County, Iowa
- Kossuth, Mississippi, a village
- Kossuth, Ohio, an unincorporated place in Auglaize County
- Kossuth Colony Historic District, an area in Dayton, Ohio
- Kossuth, Wisconsin

== Other uses ==
- Kossuth (surname)
  - Lajos Kossuth, Hungarian statesman
- "Kossuth" (Bartók), Sz. 75a, BB 31, a symphonic poem by Béla Bartók inspired by Lajos Kossuth
- Kossuth (Dungeons & Dragons), an elemental fire deity in the Dungeons & Dragons role-playing game

== See also ==
- Kossuth hat or slouch hat
- Kossuth Memorial, a statue of Lajos Kossuth in front of the Hungarian Parliament Building
- Kossuth Prize, a state award in Hungary
- Kossuth Rádió, a main public radio station of Hungary
- Kossuth Bridge, a bridge over the river Danube in Budapest from 1945 to 1960
- Košúty, a village and municipality in Galanta District, Trnava Region, south-west Slovakia
