= Mystkowski =

Polish-Lithuanian noble family

- Earliest mention: 1297
- Towns: Mystkowo, Mystki-Rzym
- Families: Mystkowski

The Mystkowski family is one of several noble families using the Puchała coat-of-arms during the time of the Polish–Lithuanian Commonwealth. First mention of the Mystkowski family comes from the Kodeks Dyplomatyczny Księstwa Mazowieckiego or 'The Diplomatic Code of the Duchy of Mazovia'. In this book, mention is made of a Comes Thomas (the Latin word Comes can be roughly translated as Count), the castellan of Nosylk, being granted the town of Myzlicow. Nosylk is the modern-day city of Nasielsk. Myzlicow is the modern town of Mystkowo, which is considered to be the ancestral land of the Mystkowski family.

== Family members of note ==
- Kazimierz Wiesław Mystkowski (born 13 April 1958), a computer engineer, formerly married to Princess Maria of Romania, youngest daughter of former King Michael I of Romania and Princess Anne of Bourbon-Parma.
- Ignacy Mystkowski (born 4 February 1826 – died 13 May 1863), Polish nobleman and lieutenant-colonel, involved with the Polish National Government and who was a commander of the revolutionary forces during the January Uprising. Mystkowski won a major victory at the Battle of Stok. He was later killed in action during the Battle of Kietlanka and was buried with full military honors.
- Tomasz Mystkowski, progenitor of the Mystkowski family, comes (count) and castellan of Nasielsk in the service of Prince Bolesław II, Duke of Masovia.
