= Kosut (disambiguation) =

Kosut is a village in Iran.

Kosut may also refer to:

- A variant of Kossuth (surname)
- Emircan Koşut (born 1995), Turkish basketball player
