= Sielc =

Sielc may refer to the following places:

- Sielc, Masovian Voivodeship (east-central Poland)
- Sielc, Podlaskie Voivodeship (north-east Poland)
