= Battle of Kietlanka =

- Part of the January Uprising
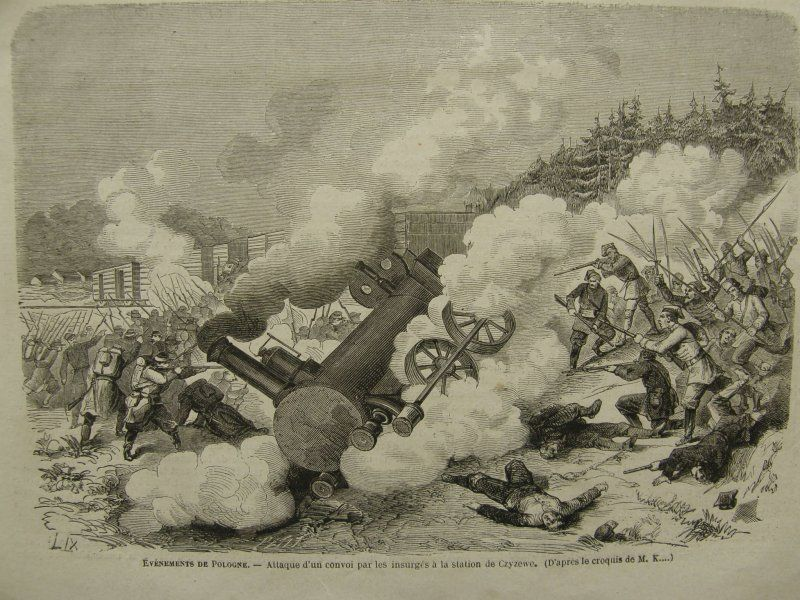
- 1863 illustration depicting the battle
Date	13 May 1863
Location	Kietlanka, Poland
Result	Russian victory

Belligerents
Polish National Government	Russian Empire

Commanders and leaders
Ignacy Mystkowski †	Nikolay Toll

Strength
several companies	around 360 grenadiers, around 50 Cossacks, a few rifle troops companies

Casualties and losses
40 dead, 25 wounded, around 80 captured	60 dead and wounded

The Battle of Kietlanka (Note: Polish: bitwa pod Kietlanką; Russian: сражение под Кетлянкой; transcitpion: srazheniye pod Ketlyankoy) was a battle of the January Uprising, fought on 13 May 1863, between the insurrect forces against the forces of the Russian Empire. It was fought near the village of Kietlanka, Poland.

== Background ==
On 25 April 1863, following the victorious battle of Stok during the January Uprising, the detachment of the Polish insurgents commanded by lieutenant colonel Ignacy Mystkowski connected with another group of rebels, and begun marching alongside the railway tracks. The joined formation counted 1200 people, however despite that, it lacked enough firearms and ammunition. As such, they have decided to attack the train transporting three grenadier companies of around 360 soldiers, and weapons, heading to the Małkinia Górna.

Before the battle, the insurgents commanded by lieutenant colonel Ignacy Mystkowski had attacked and defeated the Russian squad of soldiers, that was guarding the Małkinia railway station. Later, on the morning of 13 May 1863, near the village of Kietlanka, Poland, the insurgents had laid a trap on the military train removed the steel rails from the railway tracks, replacing them with wooden replicas, planning to derail the upcoming train. Then, several companies of the insurgents placed themselves on one side of track, awaiting the train. However, a few hours before the attack, the local flagman, who had previously noticed the insurgent forces passing through that area, had alerted the Russian offices of the possible ambush. As such, the train driver, expecting the possibility of an ambush, began slowing down the train earlier than scheduled. Due to that, when train reached the trap, only the first few cars derailed.

== The battle ==
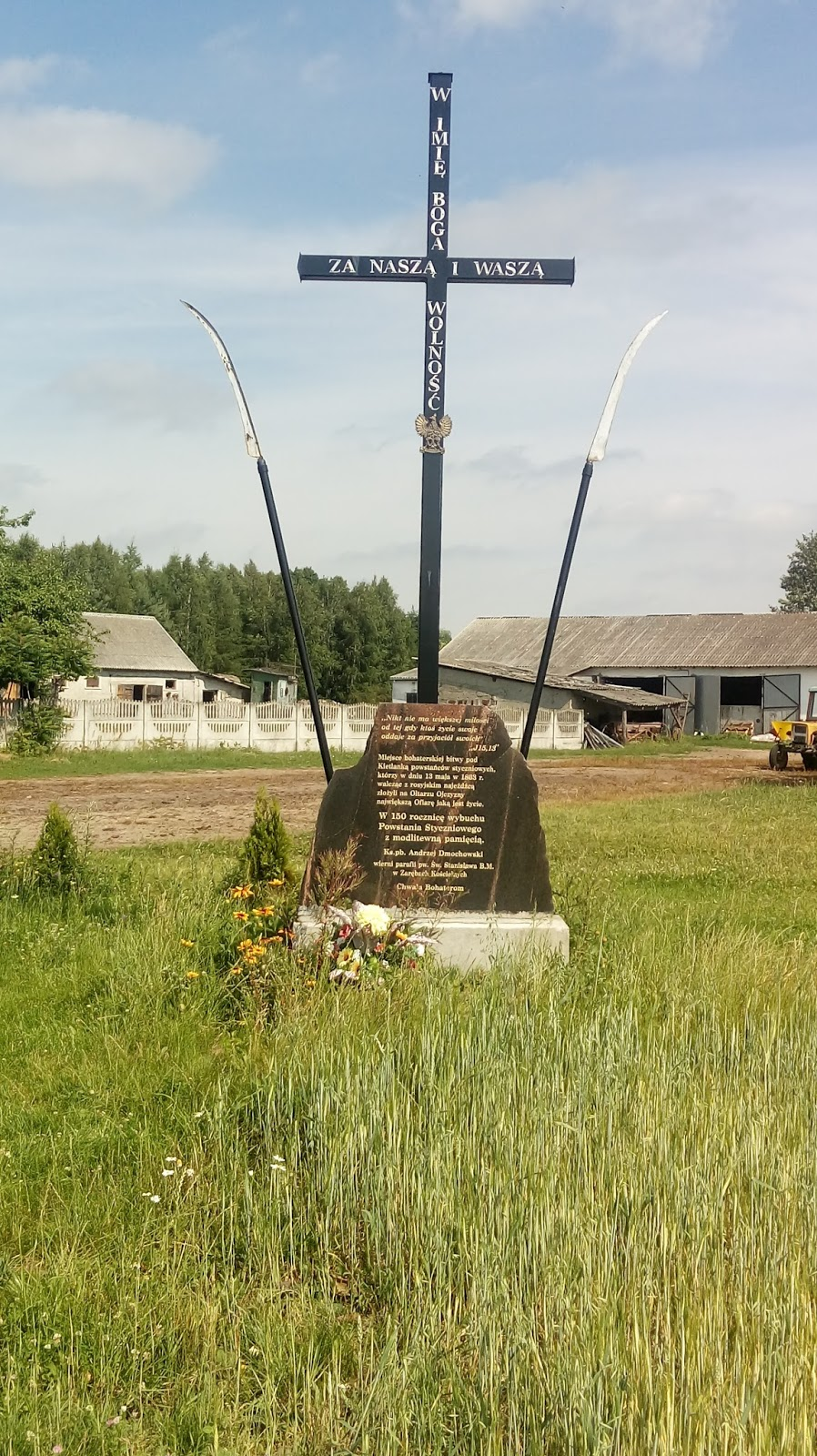
The monument in Kietlanka commemorating the battle.

Following the derailment of the train, the insurgents laid heavy fire on the Russian forces inside, commanded by the major general Nikolay Toll. Due to miscalculations made earlier insurgents, that led them to occupy positions only on the one side of the track, the Russian soldiers left the train, and took position behind it, on the opposite side of the track, and begun firing from the gaps between train wheels. In the early stage of the battle, all main leaders of the insurgent forces were killed, which included: Ignacy Mystkowski, Leopold Pluciński, Józef Podbielski, and Władysław Ostaszewski. The fight lasted for the several hours, with neither side being able to gain the upper hand.

Eventually, the Russian reinforcements, previously stationed near Czyżew, had arrived, tipping the scale of the battle of the Russian side. It included a few rifle companies and a squadron of Cossack host, consisting of around 50 Cossack soldiers. The rebels were pushed back, taking a defensive position, and eventually retreating into the forest. They had also received reinforcements, which allowed them to temporarily withhold Russian attacks. However, eventually, the Cossack squadron managed to bypass the rebel defenses, hitting them from the back, and surrounding them. As such, the insurgents begun to scatter in different directions across the forest, retreating from the fight. By the evening, the remnants of the rebel detachment managed to break through the swamps, retreating from the fight. Russian troops were ordered not to pursue them.

The battle ended with Russian victory. In the fight were killed 40 Polish insurgents, 25 were wounded, and about 80 were captured. Additionally, an unknown number of them had fled or drowned during the retreat to the swamps. According to the Polish data, around 60 Russian troops were either killed or wounded.
