= Chmielewo, Gmina Zaręby Kościelne =

Chmielewo
- Village
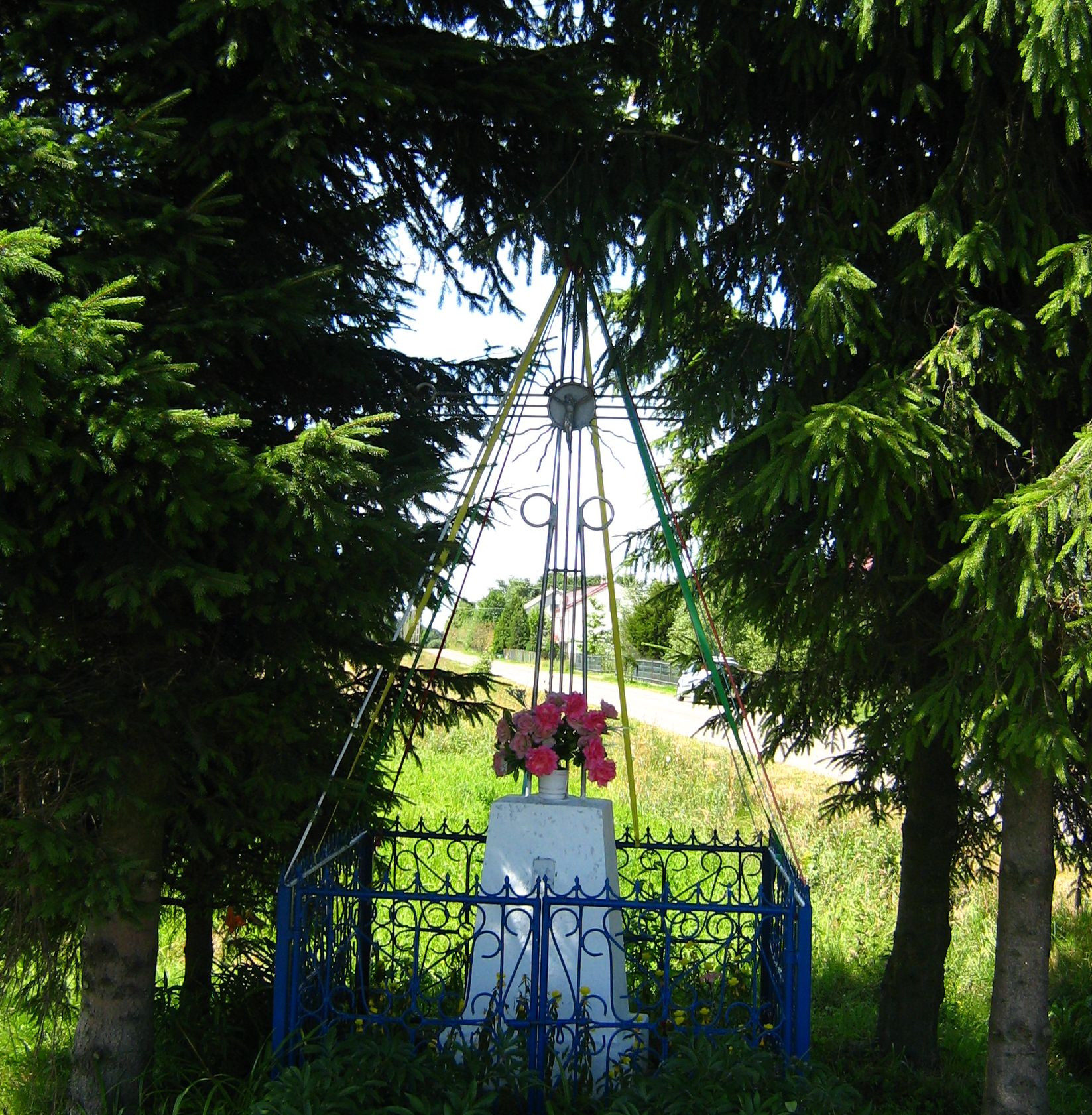
- Wayside cross at the crossroads. Chmielewo (the hamlet of Kawał), commune Zaręby Kościelne near Ostrów Mazowiecka

- Coat of arms

- Location within Poland
- Coordinates: 52°47′03″N 22°04′47″E
- Country: Poland
- Voivodeship: Masovian
- County: Ostrów
- Gmina: Zaręby Kościelne

Chmielewo [xmjɛˈlɛvɔ] is a village in the administrative district of Gmina Zaręby Kościelne, within Ostrów County, Masovian Voivodeship, in east-central Poland.
