= Nienałty-Szymany =

- Village
- Location within Poland
- Coordinates: 52°46′08″N 22°07′32″E
- Country: Poland
- Voivodeship: Masovian
- County: Ostrów
- Gmina: Zaręby Kościelne

Nienałty-Szymany (Polish pronunciation: [ɲɛˈɲawtɨ ʂɨˈmanɨ]) is a village in the administrative district of Gmina Zaręby Kościelne, within Ostrów County, Masovian Voivodeship, in east-central Poland.
