= Grabowo, Gmina Zaręby Kościelne =

Grabowo
- Village
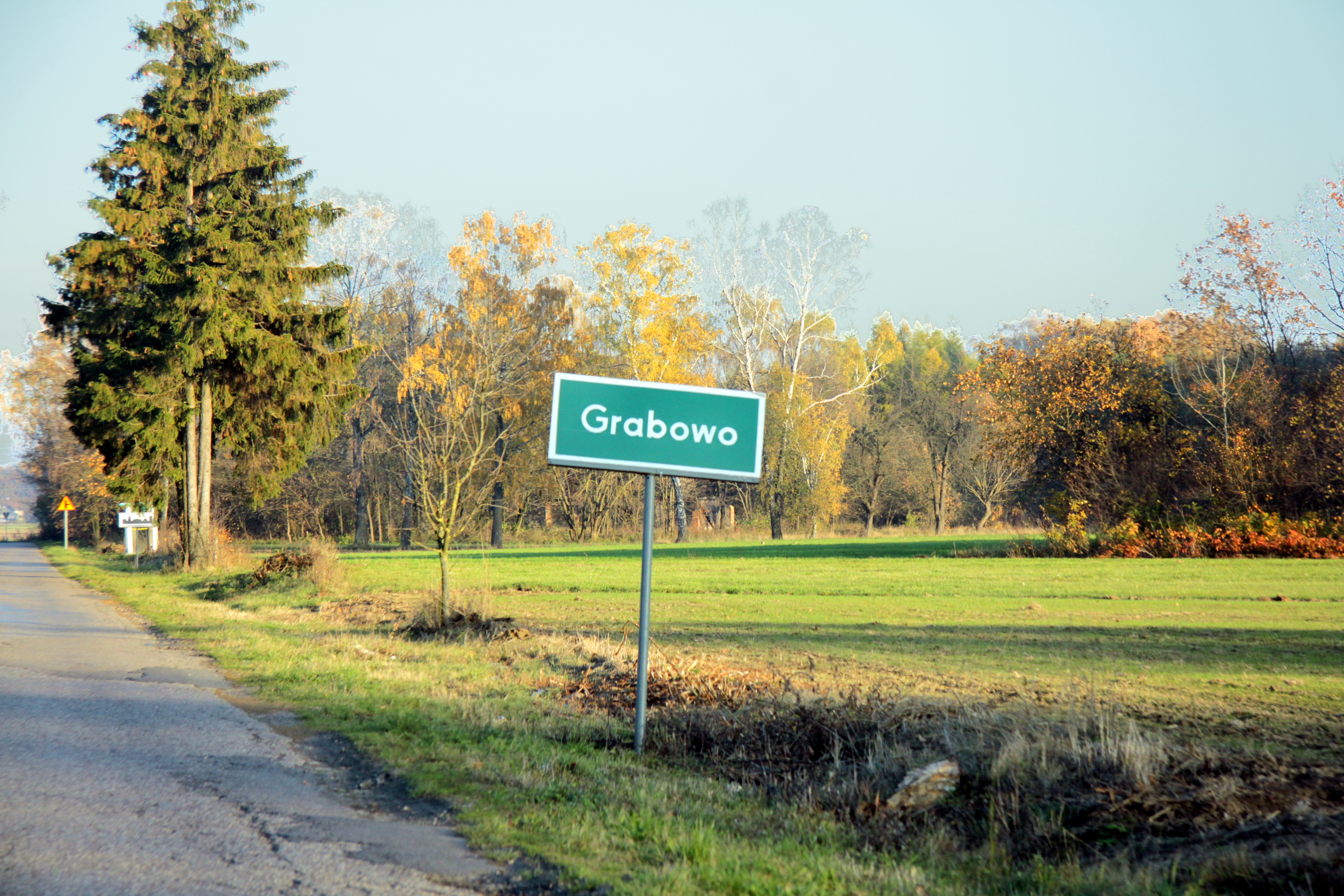

- Location within Poland
- Coordinates: 52°45′19″N 22°09′46″E
- Country: Poland
- Voivodeship: Masovian
- County: Ostrów
- Gmina: Zaręby Kościelne

Grabowo [ɡraˈbɔvɔ] is a village in the administrative district of Gmina Zaręby Kościelne, within Ostrów County, Masovian Voivodeship, in east-central Poland.
