= Komorowo, Gmina Ostrów Mazowiecka =

Komorowo
- Village
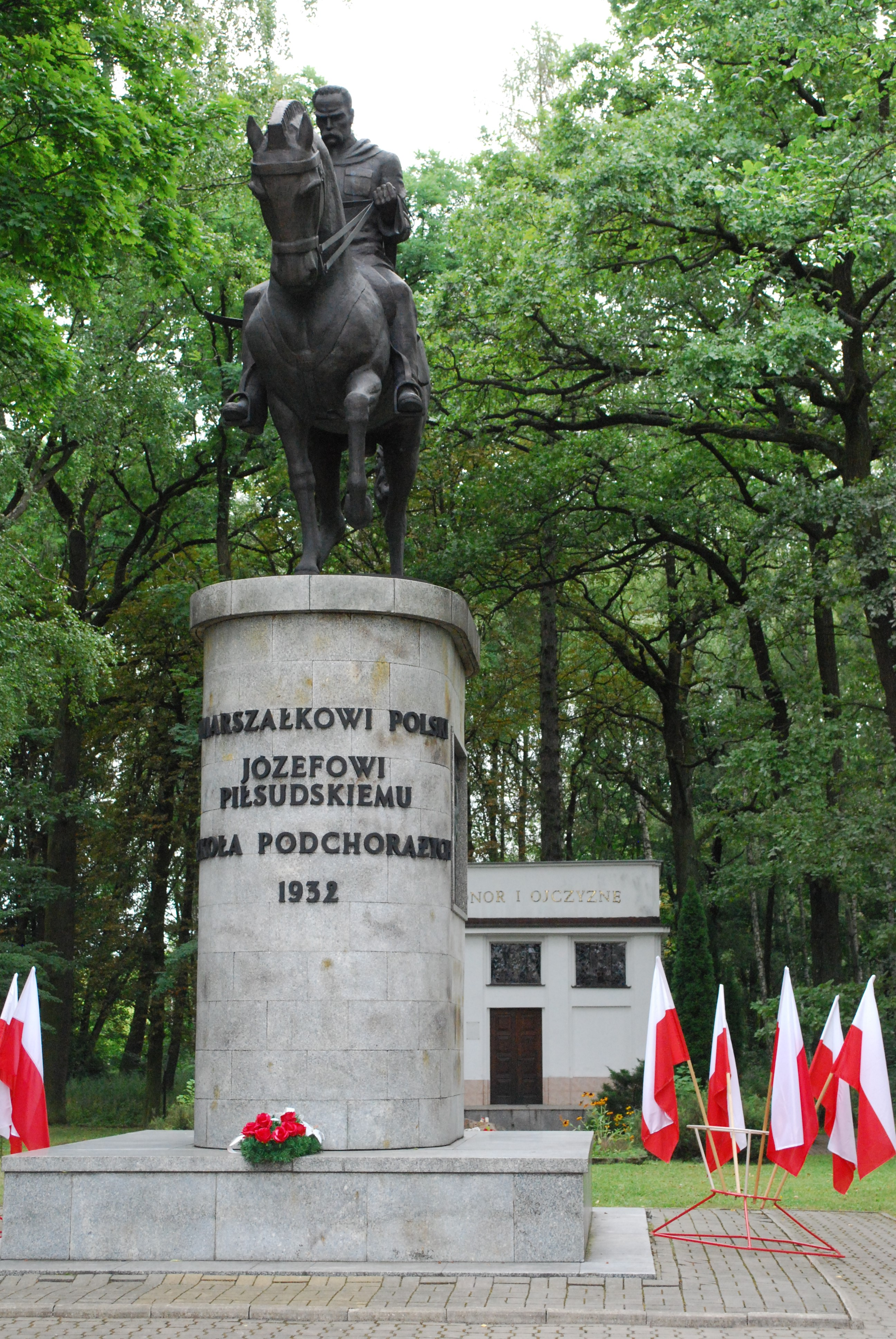
- Józef Piłsudski monument in Komorowo

- Location within Poland
- Coordinates: 52°50′N 21°51′E
- Country: Poland
- Voivodeship: Masovian
- County: Ostrów
- Gmina: Ostrów Mazowiecka

Population
  - Total: 2,000
- Time zone: UTC+1 (CET)
  - Summer (DST): UTC+2 (CEST)
- Vehicle registration: WOR

Komorowo [kɔmɔˈrɔvɔ] is a village in the administrative district of Gmina Ostrów Mazowiecka, within Ostrów County, Masovian Voivodeship, in east-central Poland.

== History ==
In 1827, Komorowo had a population of 185, which by the 1880s grew to 385.

In the interbellum, barracks of the Polish 18th Light Artillery Regiment were located in Komorowo.

Following the joint German-Soviet invasion of Poland, which started World War II in September 1939, the village was occupied by Germany. In 1941–1943, the German administration operated the Stalag 333 prisoner-of-war camp in the pre-war barracks.
