= Ignacy Mystkowski =

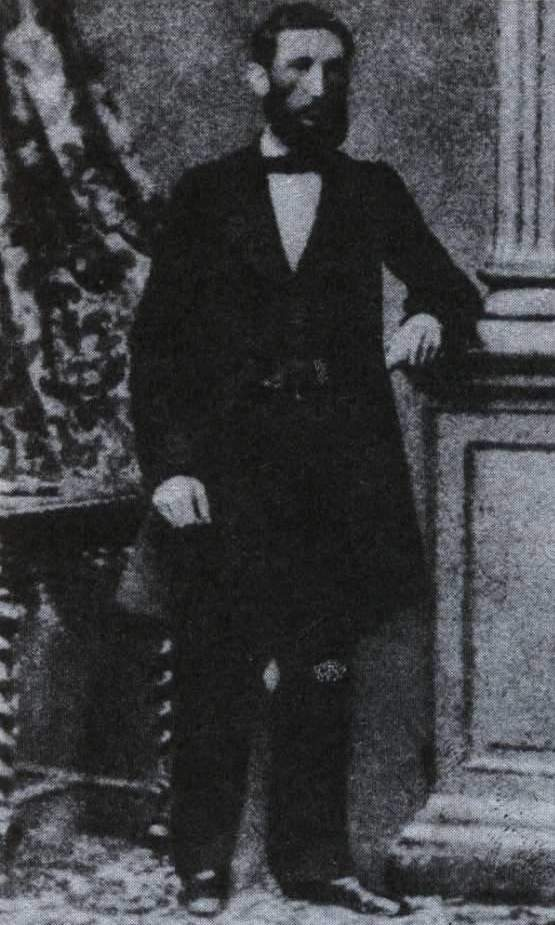
Ignatius Mystkowski ps. Ojciec

Ignacy Mystkowski (February 4, 1826 – May 13, 1863) was a Polish nobleman, railroad engineer who became a commander of insurgent forces during the period of the January Uprising and was promoted to the rank of lieutenant-colonel. By birth, he was member of Mystkowski family.

Mystkowski studied engineering in France. As an engineer he worked on the railway transport of the Saint Petersburg–Warsaw Railway, donated for use in December 1862 and running through Malkinia.

During the January Uprising he commanded about 1,200 insurgents. Along with his soldiers, he defeated the Russians in the Battle of Stok in early May 1863 and was promoted to the rank of lieutenant-colonel. He died on May 13, 1863, during the Battle of Kietlanka.

== Bibliography ==
- Stefan Kieniewicz, Powstanie styczniowe, Warsaw 1972; ISBN 83-01-03652-4.
- Cz. Vol. Brodzicki D. Godlewska, Lomza in the years 1794-1866. PWN, Warsaw 1987 rs 268. available at: historialomzy.pl. (2014-01-19).
- , source detailing the events concerning Mystkowski's detachment during the events of the Uprising.
- , biography of Ignatius Mystkowski.
