= Biel, Gmina Ostrów Mazowiecka =

Biel
- Village
- Location within Poland
- Coordinates: 52°47′N 21°58′E
- Country: Poland
- Voivodeship: Masovian
- County: Ostrów
- Gmina: Ostrów Mazowiecka

Biel [bjɛl] is a village in the administrative district of Gmina Ostrów Mazowiecka, within Ostrów County, Masovian Voivodeship, in east-central Poland.
