= Świerże-Kończany =

- Village
- Location within Poland
- Coordinates: 52°46′39″N 22°09′52″E
- Country: Poland
- Voivodeship: Masovian
- County: Ostrów
- Gmina: Zaręby Kościelne

Świerże-Kończany (Polish pronunciation: [ˈɕfjɛrʐɛ kɔj̃ˈt͡ʂanɨ]) is a village in the administrative district of Gmina Zaręby Kościelne, within Ostrów County, Masovian Voivodeship, in east-central Poland.
