= Battle of Nagoszewo =

Battle between Polish rebels and Russia (1863)

- Part of the January Uprising
Date	2–3 June 1863
Location	Nagoszewo
Result	Polish victory

Belligerents
(Poland) Polish insurgents	Russian Empire

Commanders and leaders
Maksymilian Broniewski	

The Battle of Nagoszewo was a clash between Polish rebel forces and units of the Imperial Russian Army during the January Uprising. It took place on 2–3 June 1863 near the village of Nagoszewo, which at that time belonged to Russian-controlled Congress Poland. Rebel forces, commanded by Maksymilian Broniewski fought off three columns of Russian troops. The rebels were reinforced by local peasants, who joined them. After the clash, the Russians murdered 110 residents of Nagoszew, and the village was burned. Bodies of victims were buried in a mass grave, where in 1917 a monument was unveiled.

== Sources ==
- Stefan Kieniewicz: Powstanie styczniowe. Warszawa: Państwowe Wydawnictwo Naukowe, 1983. ISBN 83-01-03652-4.
