= Gąsiorowo, Gmina Zaręby Kościelne =

Gąsiorowo
- Village
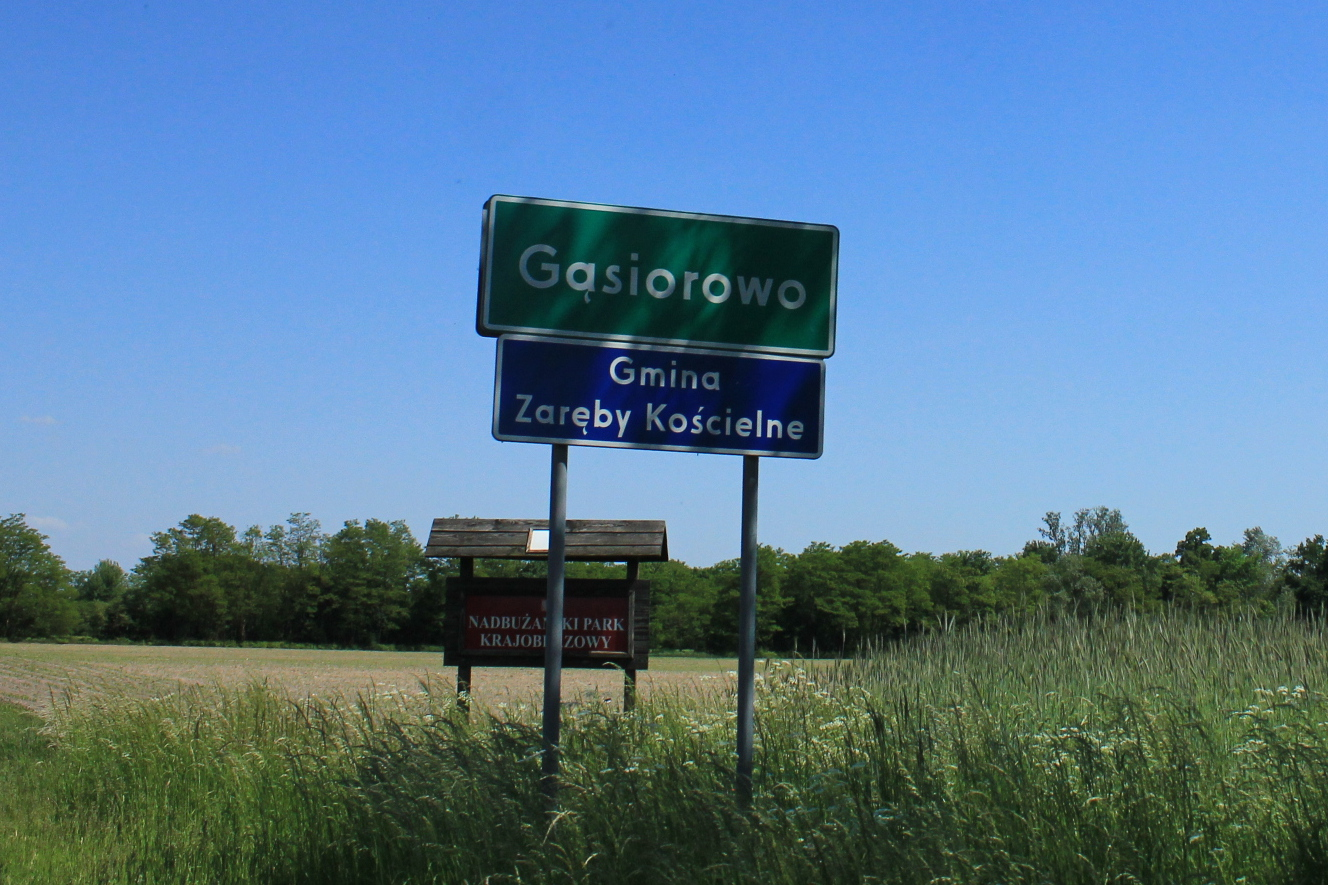
- Road limit sign in Gąsiorowo

- Location within Poland
- Coordinates: 52°42′32″N 22°09′19″E
- Country: Poland
- Voivodeship: Masovian
- County: Ostrów
- Gmina: Zaręby Kościelne

Gąsiorowo [ɡɔ̃ɕɔˈrɔvɔ] is a village within the administrative district of Gmina Zaręby Kościelne, within Ostrów County, Masovian Voivodeship, in east-central Poland.
