= Kańkowo-Piecki =

Village in Gmina Zaręby Kościelne, Poland

- Village
- Location within Poland
- Coordinates: 52°43′47″N 22°04′44″E
- Country: Poland
- Voivodeship: Masovian
- County: Ostrów
- Gmina: Zaręby Kościelne

Kańkowo-Piecki [kaɲˈkɔvɔ ˈpjɛt͡ski] is a village in the administrative district of Gmina Zaręby Kościelne, within Ostrów County, Masovian Voivodeship, in east-central Poland.
