= Nagoszewo =

- Village
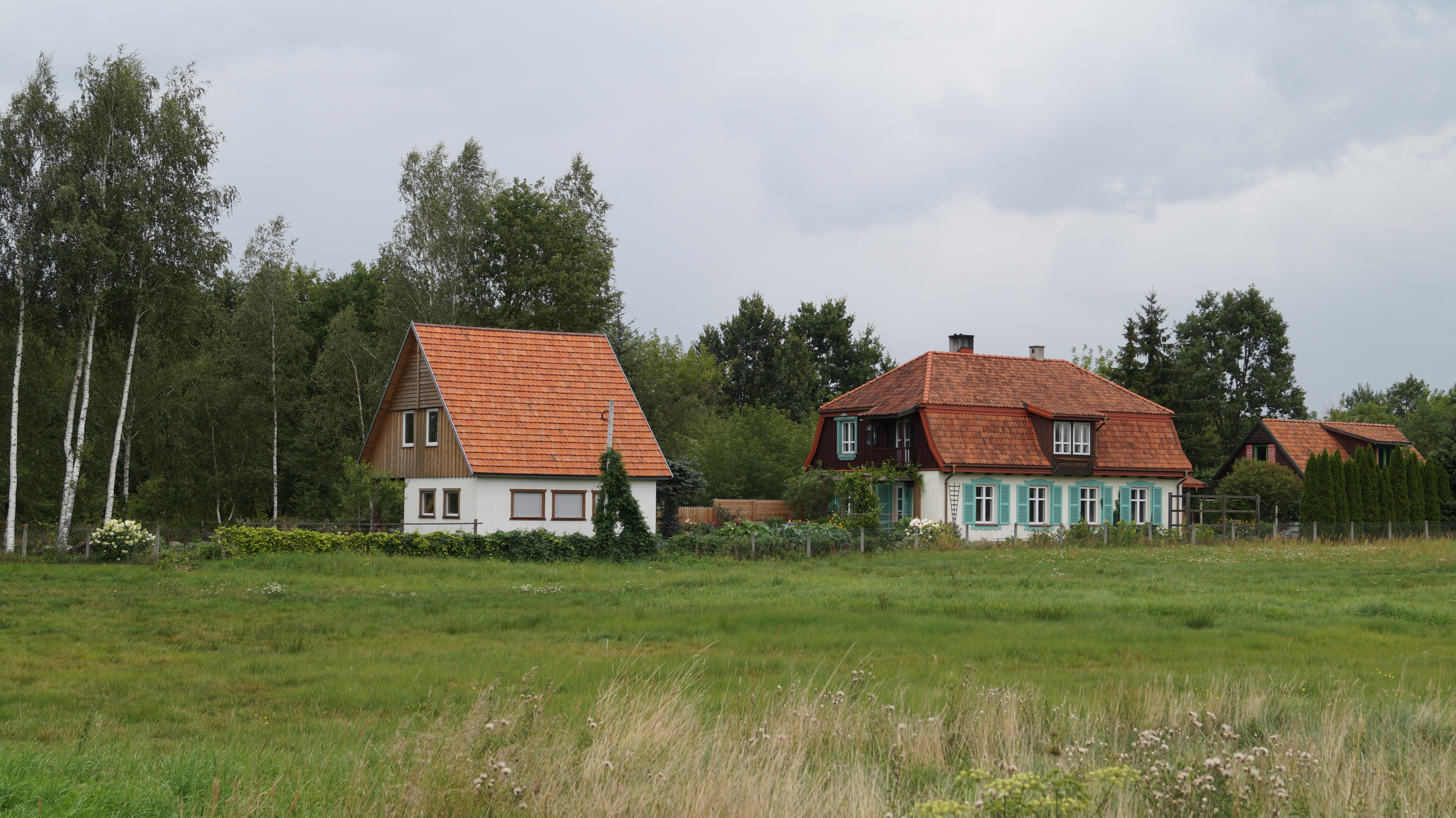

- Location within Poland
- Coordinates: 52°45′2″N 21°48′48″E
- Country: Poland
- Voivodeship: Masovian
- County: Ostrów
- Gmina: Ostrów Mazowiecka
- Time zone: UTC+1 (CET)
  - Summer (DST): UTC+2 (CEST)
- Vehicle registration: WOR

Nagoszewo [naɡɔˈʂɛvɔ] is a village in the administrative district of Gmina Ostrów Mazowiecka, within Ostrów County, Masovian Voivodeship, in east-central Poland.

== History ==
Nagoszewo was a private church village of the Diocese of Płock, administratively located in the Kamieniec County in the Masovian Voivodeship in the Greater Poland Province of the Kingdom of Poland.

In 1827, it had a population 407.

On 3 June 1863, during the January Uprising, the Battle of Nagoszewo took place near the village, which was then part of Congress Poland. After the battle, Russian troops murdered more than 100 villagers. A memorial in their honor was unveiled in 1917 after that area rejoined Poland.
