= Antoniewo, Gmina Ostrów Mazowiecka =

Antoniewo
- Village
- Location within Poland
- Coordinates: 52°50′4″N 21°48′12″E
- Country: Poland
- Voivodeship: Masovian
- County: Ostrów
- Gmina: Ostrów Mazowiecka

Antoniewo [antɔˈɲɛvɔ] is a village in the administrative district of Gmina Ostrów Mazowiecka, within Ostrów County, Masovian Voivodeship, in east-central Poland.
