= Stara Osuchowa =

- Village
- Location within Poland
- Coordinates: 52°44′25″N 21°41′56″E
- Country: Poland
- Voivodeship: Masovian
- County: Ostrów
- Gmina: Ostrów Mazowiecka

Stara Osuchowa [ˈstara ɔsuˈxɔva] is a village in the administrative district of Gmina Ostrów Mazowiecka, within Ostrów County, Masovian Voivodeship, in east-central Poland.
