= Stara Grabownica =

- Village
- Location within Poland
- Coordinates: 52°46′22″N 21°53′3″E
- Country: Poland
- Voivodeship: Masovian
- County: Ostrów
- Gmina: Ostrów Mazowiecka
- Population: 350

Stara Grabownica [ˈstara ɡrabɔvˈnit͡sa] is a village in the administrative district of Gmina Ostrów Mazowiecka, within Ostrów County, Masovian Voivodeship, in east-central Poland.
