= Świerże-Kiełcze =

- Village
- Location within Poland
- Coordinates: 52°47′30″N 22°09′44″E
- Country: Poland
- Voivodeship: Masovian
- County: Ostrów
- Gmina: Zaręby Kościelne

Świerże-Kiełcze (Polish pronunciation: [ˈɕfjɛrʐɛ ˈkʲɛwt͡ʂɛ]) is a village in the administrative district of Gmina Zaręby Kościelne, within Ostrów County, Masovian Voivodeship, in east-central Poland.
