= Košúty, Martin =

Košúty
- Borough
- Location of Košúty in Slovakia
- Coordinates: 49°5′24″N 18°56′3″E
- Country: Slovakia
- Region: Žilina
- District: Martin District
- Municipality: Martin
- First mentioned: 1397

Košúty (Hungarian: Kossuth) is a borough of Martin, Slovakia. Košúty was initially a separate village, it has been merged in 1919 with a neighboring village Priekopa and it became a borough of Martin in 1949.

The first written mention of Košúty was in 1397 as a village named Cosuthfalua, when belonged to the Kingdom of Hungary. The name is derived from a personal name of Slavic origin Košút (the Hungarian transcription Kossuth, see also etymology). This is supported also by another record stating that the village was owned by Andrew, son of Kosuth and by its later name Udwarch a. n. Kosswthfalwa – "Court or Košut's village" (1489).

The history of the village is closely tied to the House of Kossuth.
