= Nienałty-Brewki =

- Village
- Location within Poland
- Coordinates: 52°45′47″N 22°07′02″E
- Country: Poland
- Voivodeship: Masovian
- County: Ostrów
- Gmina: Zaręby Kościelne

Nienałty-Brewki (Polish pronunciation: [ɲɛˈɲawtɨ ˈbrɛfkʲi]) is a village in the administrative district of Gmina Zaręby Kościelne, within Ostrów County, Masovian Voivodeship, in east-central Poland.
