= Zakrzewo Wielkie, Gmina Zaręby Kościelne =

Zakrzewo Wielkie
- Village
- Location within Poland
- Coordinates: 52°43′N 22°13′E
- Country: Poland
- Voivodeship: Masovian
- County: Ostrów
- Gmina: Zaręby Kościelne

Zakrzewo Wielkie [zaˈkʂɛvɔ ˈvjɛlkʲɛ] is a village in the administrative district of Gmina Zaręby Kościelne, within Ostrów County, Masovian Voivodeship, in east-central Poland.
