= Nowa Grabownica =

- Village
- Location within Poland
- Coordinates: 52°45′11″N 21°51′44″E
- Country: Poland
- Voivodeship: Masovian
- County: Ostrów
- Gmina: Ostrów Mazowiecka

Nowa Grabownica [ˈnɔva ɡrabɔvˈnit͡sa] is a village in the administrative district of Gmina Ostrów Mazowiecka, within Ostrów County, Masovian Voivodeship, in east-central Poland.
