= Jelonki, Gmina Ostrów Mazowiecka =

Jelonki
- Village
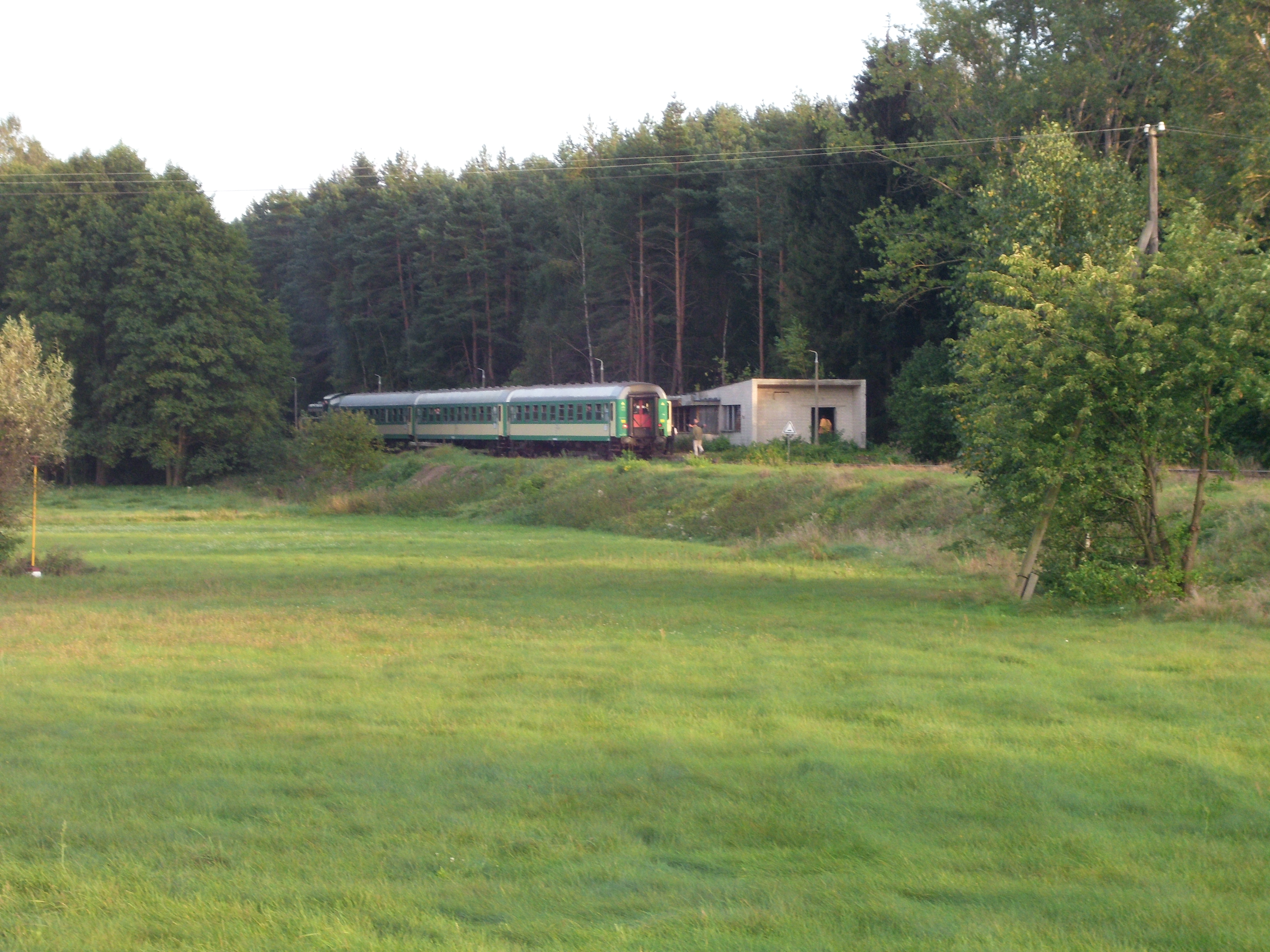

- Location within Poland
- Coordinates: 52°53′11″N 21°48′32″E
- Country: Poland
- Voivodeship: Masovian
- County: Ostrów
- Gmina: Ostrów Mazowiecka

Jelonki [jɛˈlɔnki] is a village in the administrative district of Gmina Ostrów Mazowiecka, within Ostrów County, Masovian Voivodeship, in east-central Poland.
