= Nowe Lubiejewo =

- Village
- Location within Poland
- Coordinates: 52°50′52″N 21°53′42″E
- Country: Poland
- Voivodeship: Masovian
- County: Ostrów
- Gmina: Ostrów Mazowiecka

Nowe Lubiejewo [ˈnɔvɛ lubjɛˈjɛvɔ] is a village in the administrative district of Gmina Ostrów Mazowiecka, within Ostrów County, Masovian Voivodeship, in east-central Poland.
