= Rawy-Gaczkowo =

- Village
- Location within Poland
- Coordinates: 52°46′31″N 22°06′10″E
- Country: Poland
- Voivodeship: Masovian
- County: Ostrów
- Gmina: Zaręby Kościelne

Rawy-Gaczkowo (Polish pronunciation: [ˈravɨ ɡat͡ʂˈkɔvɔ]) is a village in the administrative district of Gmina Zaręby Kościelne, within Ostrów County, Masovian Voivodeship, in east-central Poland.
