= Kępiste-Borowe =

- Village
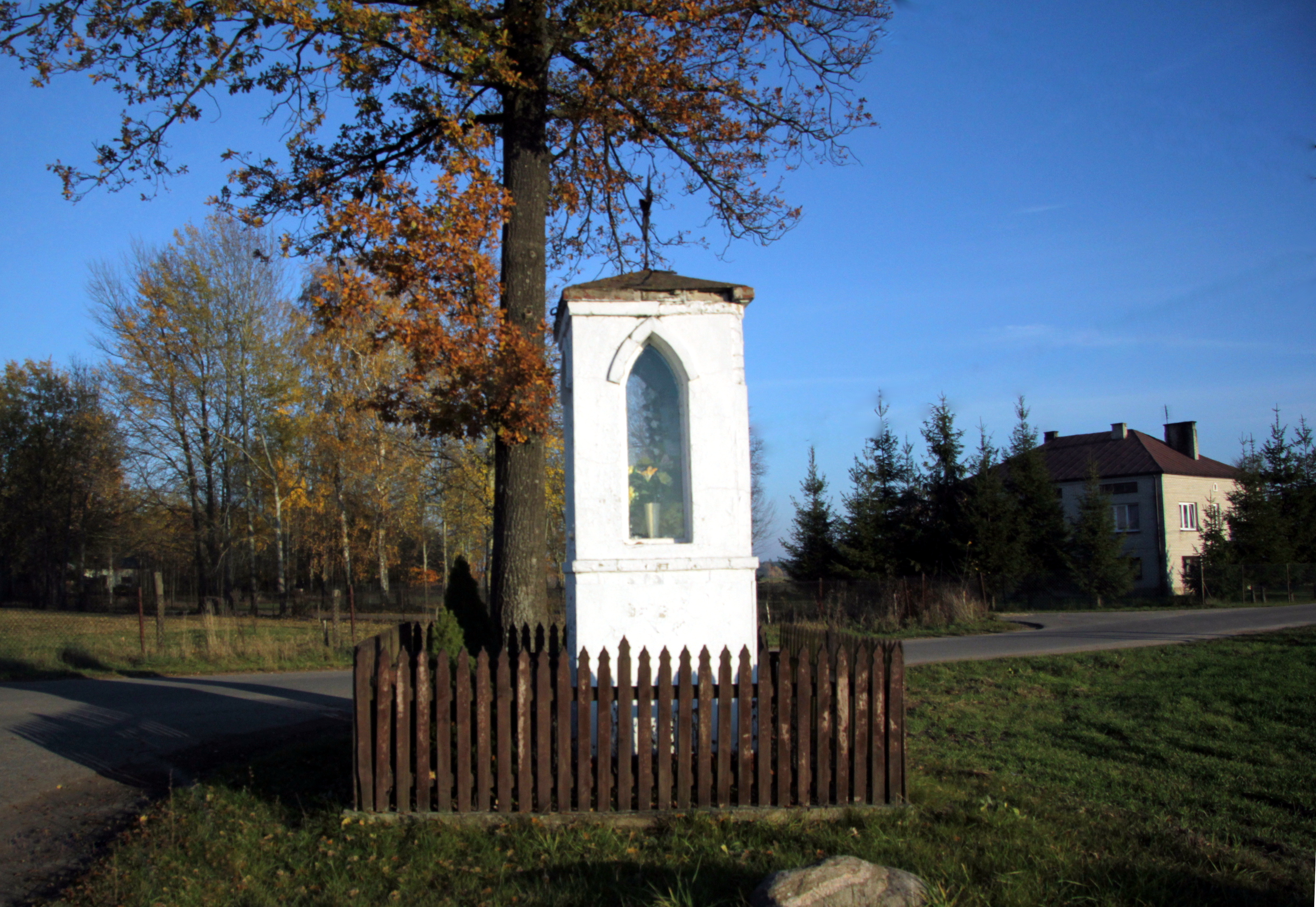

- Location within Poland
- Coordinates: 52°44′10″N 22°06′36″E
- Country: Poland
- Voivodeship: Masovian
- County: Ostrów
- Gmina: Zaręby Kościelne

Kępiste-Borowe [kɛmˈpistɛ bɔˈrɔvɛ] is a village in the administrative district of Gmina Zaręby Kościelne, within Ostrów County, Masovian Voivodeship, in east-central Poland.
