= Dybki =

- Village
- Location within Poland
- Coordinates: 52°44′N 21°43′E
- Country: Poland
- Voivodeship: Masovian
- County: Ostrów
- Gmina: Ostrów Mazowiecka

Dybki [ˈdɨpki] is a village in the administrative district of Gmina Ostrów Mazowiecka, within Ostrów County, Masovian Voivodeship, in east-central Poland.
