= Sulęcin-Kolonia =

- Village
- Location within Poland
- Coordinates: 52°51′40″N 21°51′40″E
- Country: Poland
- Voivodeship: Masovian
- County: Ostrów
- Gmina: Ostrów Mazowiecka

Sulęcin-Kolonia (Polish pronunciation: [suˈlɛɲtɕiŋ kɔˈlɔɲa]) is a village in the administrative district of Gmina Ostrów Mazowiecka, within Ostrów County, Masovian Voivodeship, in east-central Poland.
