= Zaręby Kościelne =

- Village
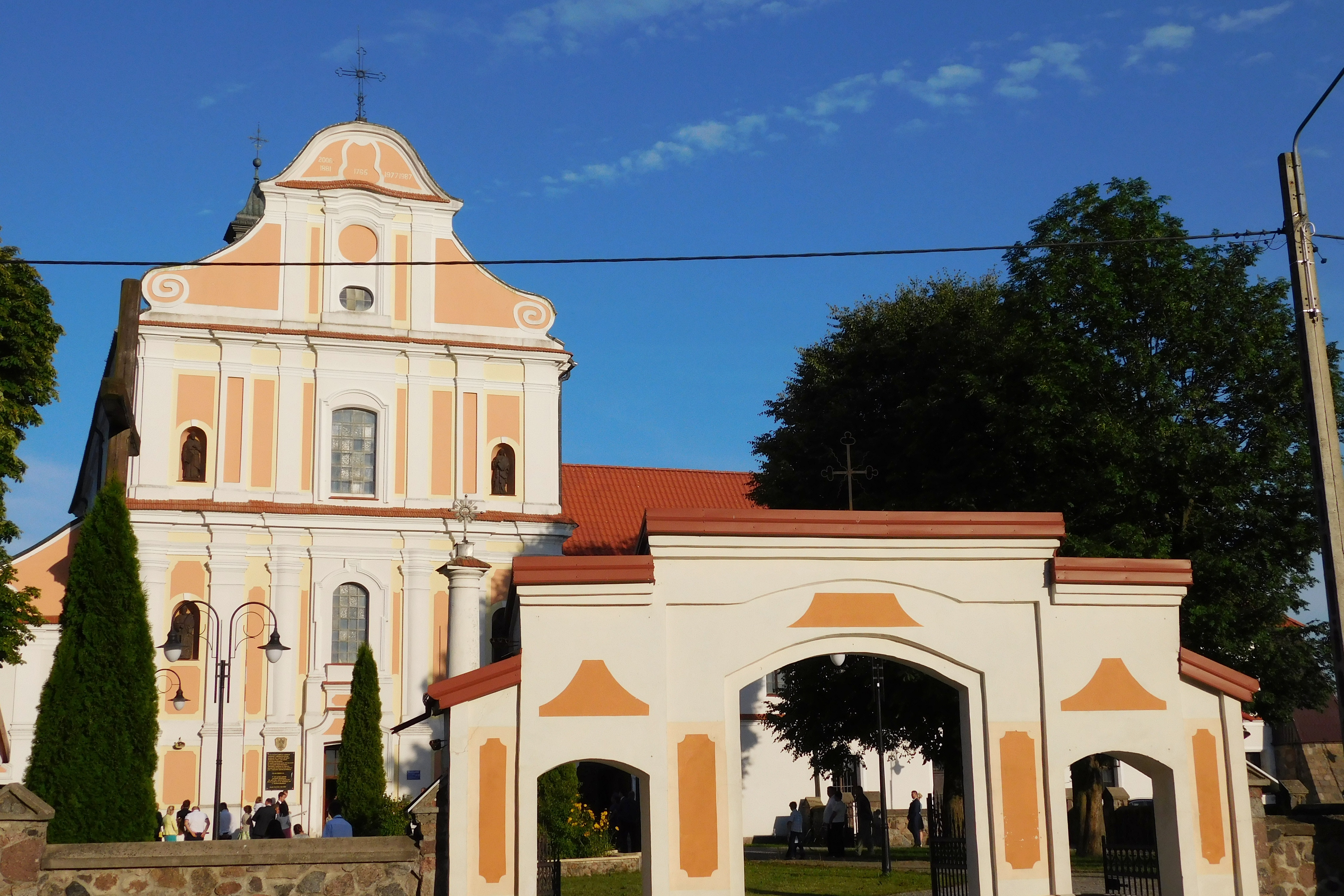
- Church of Saint Simon and Jude Thaddeus

- Location within Poland
- Coordinates: 52°45′25″N 22°7′30″E
- Country: Poland
- Voivodeship: Masovian
- County: Ostrów
- Gmina: Zaręby Kościelne

Population
  - Total: 660

Zaręby Kościelne [zaˈrɛmbɨ kɔɕˈt͡ɕɛlnɛ] is a village in Ostrów County, Masovian Voivodeship, in east-central Poland. It is the seat of the gmina (administrative district) called Gmina Zaręby Kościelne.

== Jewish history ==
Before the Holocaust the place had a considerable Jewish community. In Yiddish the place was known under the name Zarombe or Zaromb (Yiddish: זארומב.
