= Rostki-Daćbogi =

- Village
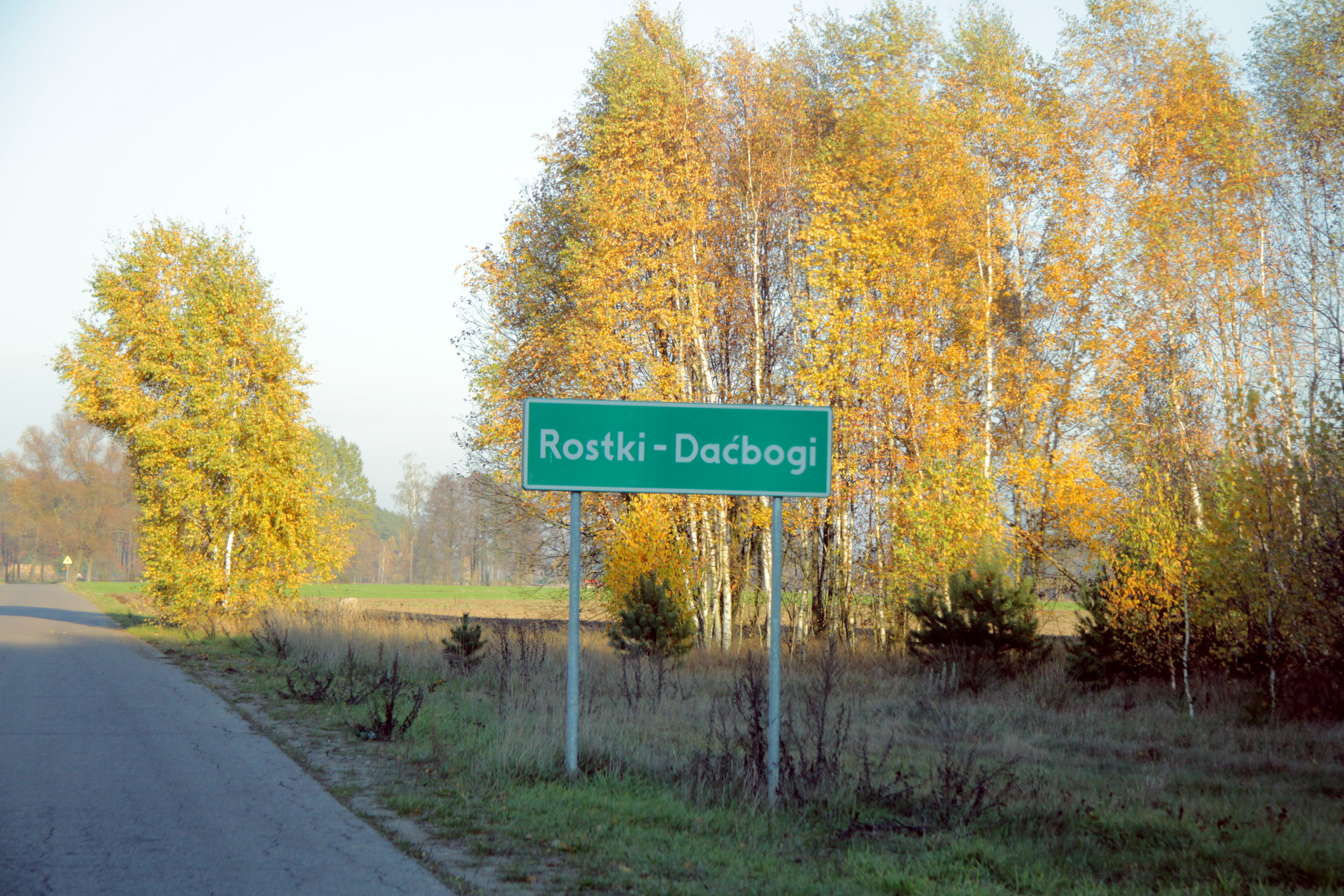

- Location within Poland
- Coordinates: 52°43′33″N 22°05′50″E
- Country: Poland
- Voivodeship: Masovian
- County: Ostrów
- Gmina: Zaręby Kościelne

Rostki-Daćbogi [ˈrɔstki dat͡ɕˈbɔɡi] is a village in the administrative district of Gmina Zaręby Kościelne, within Ostrów County, Masovian Voivodeship, in east-central Poland.
