= Zaręby Leśne =

- Village
- Location within Poland
- Coordinates: 52°45′N 22°8′E
- Country: Poland
- Voivodeship: Masovian
- County: Ostrów
- Gmina: Zaręby Kościelne

Zaręby Leśne [zaˈrɛmbɨ ˈlɛɕnɛ] is a village in the administrative district of Gmina Zaręby Kościelne, within Ostrów County, Masovian Voivodeship, in east-central Poland.
