= Świerże-Panki =

- Village
- Location within Poland
- Coordinates: 52°47′14″N 22°10′9″E
- Country: Poland
- Voivodeship: Masovian
- County: Ostrów
- Gmina: Zaręby Kościelne

Świerże-Panki (Polish pronunciation: [ˈɕfjɛrʐɛ ˈpankʲi]) is a village in the administrative district of Gmina Zaręby Kościelne, within Ostrów County, Masovian Voivodeship, in east-central Poland.
