= Dudy, Poland =

Dudy
- Village
- Location within Poland
- Coordinates: 52°45′21″N 21°53′25″E
- Country: Poland
- Voivodeship: Masovian
- County: Ostrów
- Gmina: Ostrów Mazowiecka

Dudy is a village in the administrative district of Gmina Ostrów Mazowiecka, within Ostrów County, Masovian Voivodeship, in east-central Poland.
