= Budy-Grudzie =

- Village
- Location within Poland
- Coordinates: 52°51′8″N 21°56′40″E
- Country: Poland
- Voivodeship: Masovian
- County: Ostrów
- Gmina: Ostrów Mazowiecka
- Population: 130

Budy-Grudzie [ˈbudɨ ˈɡrud͡ʑɛ] is a village in the administrative district of Gmina Ostrów Mazowiecka, within Ostrów County, Masovian Voivodeship, in east-central Poland.
