= Skłody Średnie =

- Village
- Location within Poland
- Coordinates: 52°46′N 22°9′E
- Country: Poland
- Voivodeship: Masovian
- County: Ostrów
- Gmina: Zaręby Kościelne

Skłody Średnie [ˈskwɔdɨ ˈɕrɛdɲɛ] is a village in the administrative district of Gmina Zaręby Kościelne, within Ostrów County, Masovian Voivodeship, in east-central Poland.
