= Juraj Košút =

Slovak nobleman (1781–1849)

Juraj Košút (also Ďorď or Ďurko, Hungarian: Kossuth György, 12 May 1776 – 31 July 1849) was a nobleman and lawyer in the Kingdom of Hungary, who was a supporter of the Slovak national movement.

== Family ==
He was baptized as Georgius Kossuth (Note: The Latin form of his name.) on 12 May 1776 in Necpál. His parents were Pavol (Pál) and Zsuzsanna Košút (Kossuth). He had two brothers (Šimon/Simon and Ladislav/László) and one sister (Jana).

The family had lived for centuries in Kossuth (now Košúty), dating back to the 13th century when king Béla IV of Hungary granted them nobility and the feod in Turóc (now Turiec) in 1263. The surname means "billy goat" in Slovak and a billy goat was also in their coat of arms. The family was a typical example of provincial gentry in the Kingdom of Hungary and was kindred with other families of the local gentry in the region of Turóc and Liptó. (Note: Beniczky de Benice, Rakovszky de Rákó, Raksánszky de Kisraksa, Záborszky de Zábor and Zatureczky de Zaturcsány.)

The mother tongue of the Turóc branch of the family (including him and his brother László) was Slovak and the family archive also only contains records in Slovak together with official Latin documents. (Note: Slovak documents prevailed in the archive also in the 1850s, after the Hungarian Revolution of 1848.) His brother László moved from Kossuth to Monok and would become the father of Hungarian statesman Lajos Kossuth.

Juraj Košút studied law then he returned to the family estate. On 2 November 1803, he married Anna Zolnensis; the couple had no children.

== Work ==
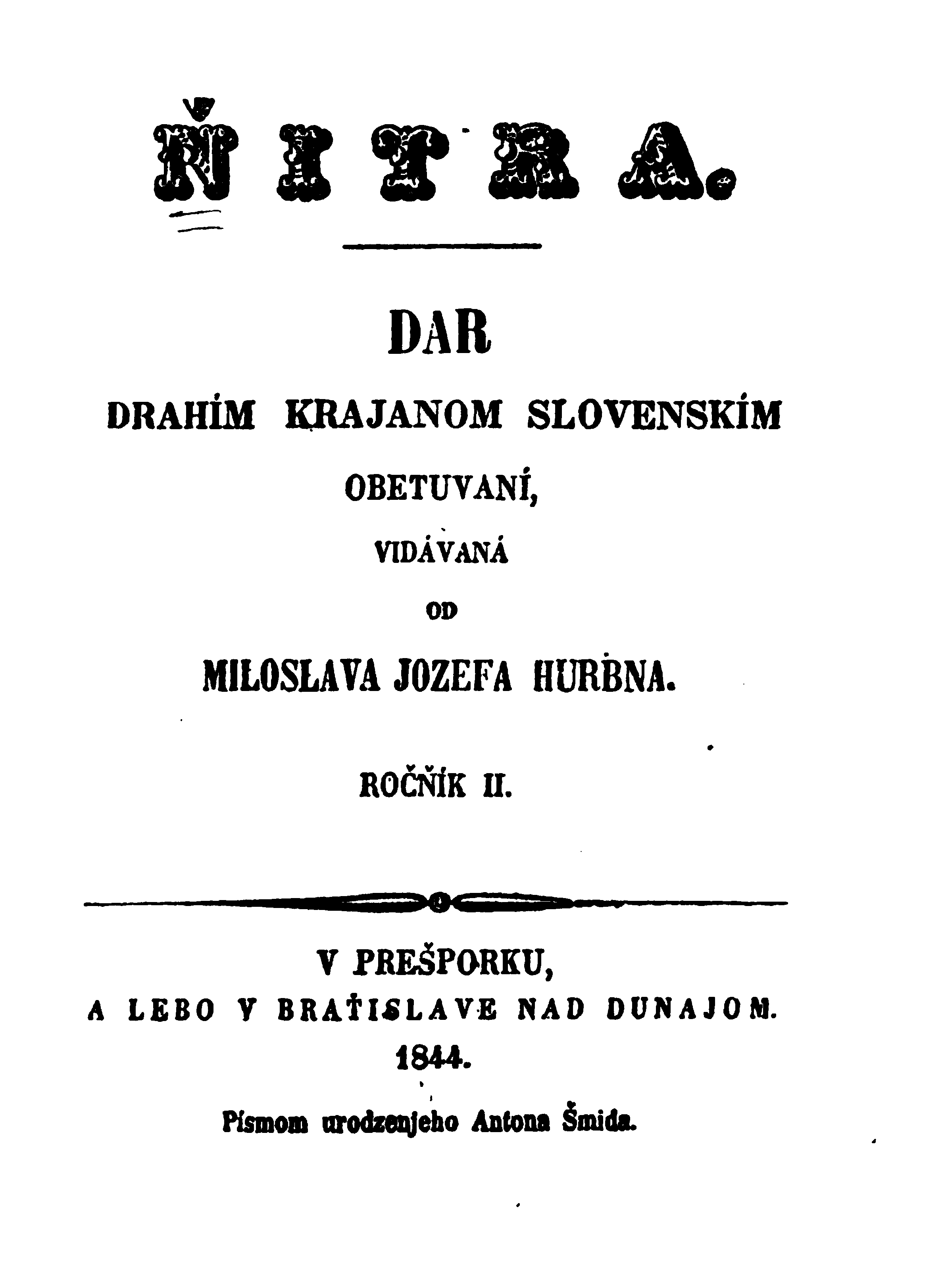
The first book printed in Štúr's language standard was dedicated to "Ďurko Košút".

His language skills, legal education and probably also the noble origin opened him many opportunities. He was an assessor in the County Court of Turóc, a lay judge in Liptó, Trencsén and Árva counties and a superintendent of the Lutheran Church in Zaturcsa. The preacher of Zaturcsa was Ján Kalinčiak, a Slovak nationalist and the father of Ján Kalinčiak – a member of Štúr's movement and a representative of Slovak romantic prose.

He became active in the Slovak national movement in 1842 when the leading personality of the movement Ľudovít Štúr required government's approval for publishing a Slovak political newspaper. Štúr had to prove sufficient social interest and that the journal would have enough readers. Štúr initially attached a petition signed by priests and seminarists from the Diocese of Nyitra, but he did not succeed. In the meantime, nobles in Turóc received information about his activities. They sent him a letter in which they promised "to bear witness" about the need for a Slovak political newspaper. Surprised Štúr figured out that they were led by "Košút, the uncle of that angry man from Pest [Lajos Kossuth]".

Košút organized petitions in several waves. The first two (at the end of 1842) were signed by 152 signatories (Note: Other sources mention 148 signatories. This number was mentioned already by Štúr's coworker Ján Francisci-Rimavský. The first petition (November 1942) was signed by 100 signatories, the second (December 1842) by 52.) who confirmed their interest in a Slovak newspaper (mostly lower nobles and officials). He also noted that he collected signatures only from one part of the county and he could collect much more if necessary. The petitions had a significant impact and according to Štúr's coworker Jozef Miloslav Hurban, they directly influenced Štúr's decision to publish his newspaper in Slovak instead of Slovakized Czech (used as a written language by Slovak Protestants) and to define a new Slovak linguistic standard instead of Kollár's biblical Czech and Bernolák's standard based on the West-Slovak dialect. The new standard was based on Central-Slovak dialects spoken also in Turóc.

He began corresponding with Štúr and promised him to make every effort "for the good of his (own) Slovak nation". In 1843, he organized the third petition signed by 675 signatories (according to Košút's letter to Pavol Jozefi). The details about this petition are not known, but it should be signed both by Catholic and Protestant Church authorities and the secular authorities including the vice-ispán of Turóc. He promoted a similar petition in the neighboring Liptó.

In 1844, the state authorities initiated steps to close the Department of the Czechoslovak Language and Literature in Pressburg (Prešporok, Pozsony, now Bratislava). Slovak activists reacted by fundraising campaigns to save the department. Košút organized the campaign among lower nobles in Turóc, but the department was closed. Štúr was later forced to leave Pressburg and Košút donated a part of the money collected to the Slovak students who decided to move with Štúr to Lőcse. Later, he supported Slovak society Tatrín which played an important role in Slovak cultural life. In 1845, Štúr finally got the permission to publish a political newspaper (Slovenskje národňje novini) and Košút contributed to the newspaper as a correspondent.

== Bibliography ==
- Demmel, József (2015). "Spisovná slovenčina a uhorskoslovenské zemianstvo. Štúrovčina ako nástroj spoločenskej integrácie?" [Standard Slovak and Hungarian-Slovak low nobility. The Štúr language as an instrument of social integration?]. In Macho, Peter; Kodajová, Daniela (eds.). Ľudovít Štúr na hranici dvoch vekov (PDF) (in Slovak). Bratislava: Historický ústav SAV, VEDA, vydavateľstvo Slovenskej akadémie vied. ISBN 978-80-224-1454-8.
- Demmel, József (2012). ""Stav zemiansky národa slovenského". Uhorská šľachta slovenského pôvodu" ["The nobility of the nation of Slovaks…": The Nobility of Slovak Origin in the Kingdom of Hungary] (PDF). Forum Historiae (in Slovak) (2). Bratislava: Historický ústav SAV. ISSN 1337-6861.
- Parenička, Pavol (14 November 1990). "Košút versus Kossuth". Slovenské národné noviny (in Slovak). Martin: Vydavateľstvo Matice slovenskej.
- Parenička, Pavol (13 August 2014). "Juraj Košút bol jednou z najpozoruhodnejších postáv slovenského národného hnutia" [Juraj Košút was one of the most notable figures of Slovak national movement]. Slovenské národné noviny (in Slovak). Martin: Vydavateľstvo Matice slovenskej.
- Parenička, Pavol (12 May 2015). "Štúrove Slovenskje národňje novini 1845 – 1848 – kapitoly z históri" [Štúr's Slovak National News 1845 – 1848 – chapters from history]. Slovenské národné noviny (in Slovak). Martin: Vydavateľstvo Matice slovenskej.
- Kovačka, Miloš (2008). "Memorialis Turčianskej stolice z roku 1707 v kontexte turčianskych výziev, proklamácií a memoránd do roku 1849" [Memorialis of Turiec County from 1707 in the context of Turiec manifetos, proclamations and memorandums]. In Kovačka, Miloš; Augustínová, Eva (eds.). Memorialis - historický spis slovenských stolíc. Zborník prác z medzinárodnej vedeckej konferencie, ktorá sa konala pri príležitosti 300. výročia tragických udalostí na počesť turčianskych martýrov Melchiora Rakovského a Krištofa Okoličániho 7. a 8. júna 2007 v Martine (PDF) (in Slovak). Martin: Slovenská národná knižnica. ISBN 978-80-89301-25-6.
