= Zgleczewo Panieńskie =

- Village
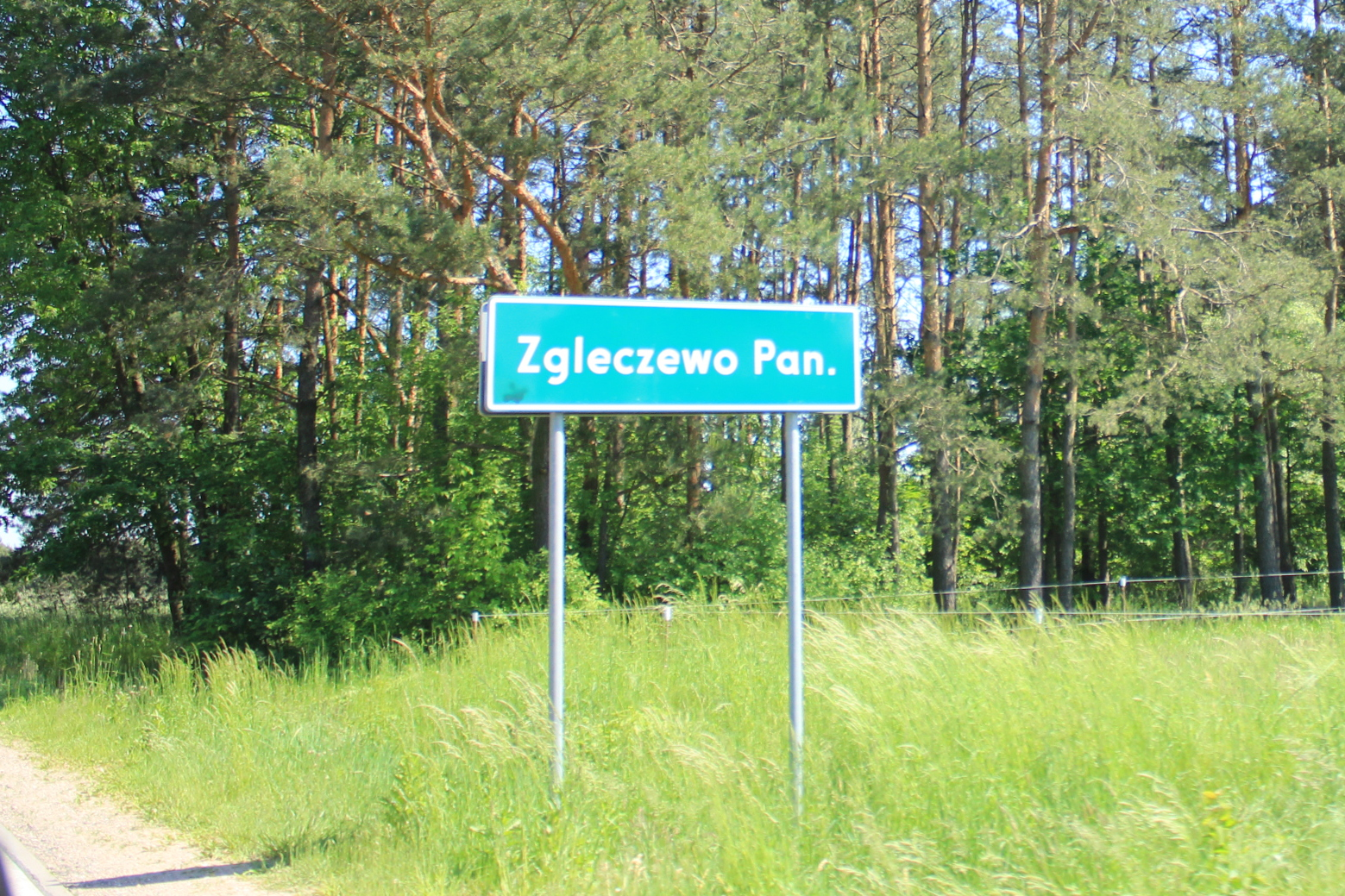

- Location within Poland
- Coordinates: 52°42′07″N 22°10′27″E
- Country: Poland
- Voivodeship: Masovian
- County: Ostrów
- Gmina: Zaręby Kościelne

Zgleczewo Panieńskie [zɡlɛˈt͡ʂɛvɔ paˈɲɛɲskʲɛ] is a village in the administrative district of Gmina Zaręby Kościelne, within Ostrów County, Masovian Voivodeship, in east-central Poland.
