= Budziszewo, Masovian Voivodeship =

Budziszewo
- Village
- Location within Poland
- Coordinates: 52°47′34″N 22°8′20″E
- Country: Poland
- Voivodeship: Masovian
- County: Ostrów
- Gmina: Zaręby Kościelne

Budziszewo [bud͡ʑiˈʂɛvɔ] is a village in the administrative district of Gmina Zaręby Kościelne, within Ostrów County, Masovian Voivodeship, in east-central Poland.
