= Gmina Zaręby Kościelne =

Gmina Zaręby Kościelne Zaręby Kościelne Commune
- Gmina
- Flag Coat of arms
- Interactive map of Gmina Zaręby Kościelne
- Coordinates (Zaręby Kościelne): 52°45′N 22°8′E
- Country: Poland
- Voivodeship: Masovian
- County: Ostrów
- Seat: Zaręby Kościelne

Area
  - Total: 88.9 km^{2} (34.3 sq mi)

Population (2013)
  - Total: 3,796
  - Density: 42.7/km^{2} (111/sq mi)

Gmina Zaręby Kościelne is a rural gmina (administrative district) in Ostrów County, Masovian Voivodeship, in east-central Poland. Its seat is the village of Zaręby Kościelne, which lies approximately 17 kilometres (11 mi) east of Ostrów Mazowiecka and 97 km (60 mi) north-east of Warsaw.

The gmina covers an area of 88.9 square kilometres (34.3 sq mi), and as of 2006 its total population is 3,844 (3,796 in 2013).

== Villages ==
Gmina Zaręby Kościelne contains the villages and settlements of Budziszewo, Chmielewo, Gaczkowo, Gąsiorowo, Grabowo, Kańkowo-Piecki, Kępiste-Borowe, Kietlanka, Kosuty, Niemiry, Nienałty-Brewki, Nienałty-Szymany, Nowa Złotoria, Pętkowo Wielkie, Pułazie, Rawy-Gaczkowo, Rostki-Daćbogi, Skłody Średnie, Skłody-Piotrowice, Skłody-Stachy, Stara Złotoria, Świerże Zielone, Świerże-Kiełcze, Świerże-Kończany, Świerże-Panki, Uścianek Wielki, Zakrzewo Wielkie, Zakrzewo-Kopijki, Zaręby Kościelne, Zaręby Leśne, Zgleczewo Panieńskie and Zgleczewo Szlacheckie.

== Neighbouring gminas ==
Gmina Zaręby Kościelne is bordered by the gminas of Andrzejewo, Ceranów, Małkinia Górna, Nur, Ostrów Mazowiecka and Szulborze Wielkie.
