= Kietlanka, Gmina Zaręby Kościelne =

Village in Masovian Voivodeship, Poland

Kietlanka
- Village
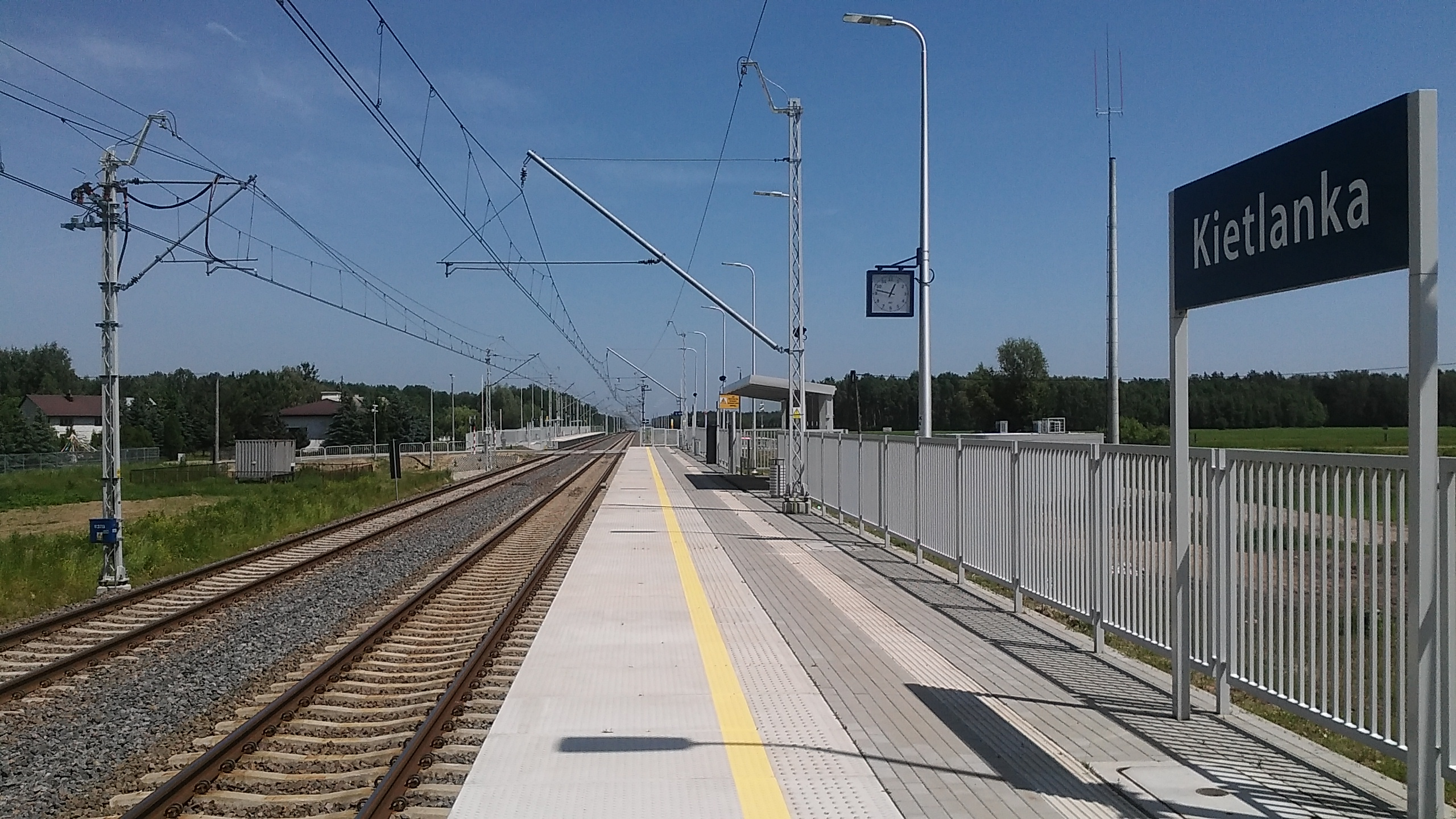
- Kietlanka railway station in 2020.

- Location within Poland
- Coordinates: 52°45′N 22°10′E
- Country: Poland
- Voivodeship: Masovian
- County: Ostrów
- Gmina: Zaręby Kościelne
- Population (2011): 180
- Time zone: UTC+1 (CET)
  - Summer (DST): UTC+2 (CEST)

Kietlanka (Polish pronunciation: [kʲɛˈtlanka]) is a village in the Masovian Voivodeship, Poland, located in the Gmina Zaręby Kościelne, Ostrów County. In 2011, it was inhabited by 180 people.
