= Kosuty, Masovian Voivodeship =

Kosuty
- Village
- Location within Poland
- Coordinates: 52°45′N 22°6′E
- Country: Poland
- Voivodeship: Masovian
- County: Ostrów
- Gmina: Zaręby Kościelne

Kosuty [kɔˈsutɨ] is a village in the administrative district of Gmina Zaręby Kościelne, within Ostrów County, Masovian Voivodeship, in east-central Poland.
