= Battle of Stok =

Battle of the January Uprising

The Battle of Stok, one of many skirmishes of the January Uprising, took place in the night of May 4/5, 1863, near the village of Stok, which at that time belonged to Russian-controlled Congress Poland. A Polish insurgent party under Ignacy Mystkowski ambushed here a detachment of the Imperial Russian Army. The battle is regarded as one of the biggest Polish victories of the uprising.

Russian column was commanded by Polish born officer, Konstanty Rynarzewski, who after the battle joined the insurgents. Poles captured a number of prisoners, weapons and equipment. The battle was presented in Juliusz Machulski’s historical film Szwadron (1993).

== Sources ==
- Stefan Kieniewicz: Powstanie styczniowe. Warszawa: Państwowe Wydawnictwo Naukowe, 1983. ISBN 83-01-03652-4.
