= Pałapus Włościański =

Coordinates: 52°52′14″N 21°56′19″E

- Village
- Interactive map of Pałapus Włościański
- Country: Poland
- Voivodeship: Masovian
- County: Ostrów
- Gmina: Gmina Ostrów Mazowiecka

Pałapus Włościański (Polish pronunciation: [paˈwapus fwɔɕˈtɕaj̃skʲi]) is a village in the administrative district of Gmina Ostrów Mazowiecka, within Ostrów County, Masovian Voivodeship, in east-central Poland.
