= Pałapus Szlachecki =

- Village
- Location within Poland
- Coordinates: 52°52′N 21°57′E
- Country: Poland
- Voivodeship: Masovian
- County: Ostrów
- Gmina: Gmina Ostrów Mazowiecka

Pałapus Szlachecki (Polish pronunciation: [paˈwapus ʂlaˈxɛtskʲi]) is a village in the administrative district of Gmina Ostrów Mazowiecka, within Ostrów County, Masovian Voivodeship, in east-central Poland. It lies approximately 9 kilometres (6 mi) north-east of Ostrów Mazowiecka and 97 km (60 mi) north-east of Warsaw.
