= Stok, Masovian Voivodeship =

Stok
- Village
- Location within Poland
- Coordinates: 52°51′4″N 21°49′7″E
- Country: Poland
- Voivodeship: Masovian
- County: Ostrów
- Gmina: Ostrów Mazowiecka
- Population: 393

Stok [stɔk] is a village in the administrative district of Gmina Ostrów Mazowiecka, within Ostrów County, Masovian Voivodeship, in east-central Poland.
