= Gmina Ostrów Mazowiecka =

Gmina Ostrów Mazowiecka Ostrów Mazowiecka Commune
- Gmina
- Flag Coat of arms
- Interactive map of Gmina Ostrów Mazowiecka
- Coordinates (Ostrów Mazowiecka): 52°48′N 21°54′E
- Country: Poland
- Voivodeship: Masovian
- County: Ostrów
- Seat: Ostrów Mazowiecka

Area
  - Total: 283.71 km^{2} (109.54 sq mi)

Population (2013)
  - Total: 12,978
  - Density: 45.744/km^{2} (118.48/sq mi)
- Website: http://www.gminaostrowmaz.home.pl/

Gmina Ostrów Mazowiecka is a rural gmina (administrative district) in Ostrów County, Masovian Voivodeship, in east-central Poland. Its seat is the town of Ostrów Mazowiecka, although the town is not part of the territory of the gmina.

The gmina covers an area of 283.71 square kilometres (109.5 sq mi), and as of 2006 its total population is 12,654 (12,978 in 2013).

== Villages ==
Gmina Ostrów Mazowiecka contains the villages and settlements of Antoniewo, Biel, Budy-Grudzie, Dudy, Dybki, Fidury, Guty-Bujno, Jasienica, Jelenie, Jelonki, Kalinowo, Kalinowo-Parcele, Komorowo, Nagoszewka Druga, Nagoszewka Pierwsza, Nagoszewo, Nieskórz, Nowa Grabownica, Nowa Osuchowa, Nowe Lubiejewo, Pałapus Szlachecki, Pałapus Włościański, Podborze, Pólki, Popielarnia, Prosienica, Przyjmy, Rogóźnia, Sielc, Smolechy, Stara Grabownica, Stara Osuchowa, Stare Lubiejewo, Stok, Sulęcin-Kolonia, Ugniewo, Wiśniewo, Zakrzewek and Zalesie.

== Neighbouring gminas ==
Gmina Ostrów Mazowiecka is bordered by the town of Ostrów Mazowiecka and by the gminas of Andrzejewo, Brańszczyk, Brok, Czerwin, Długosiodło, Małkinia Górna, Stary Lubotyń, Szumowo, Wąsewo and Zaręby Kościelne.
