= Kossuth (surname) =

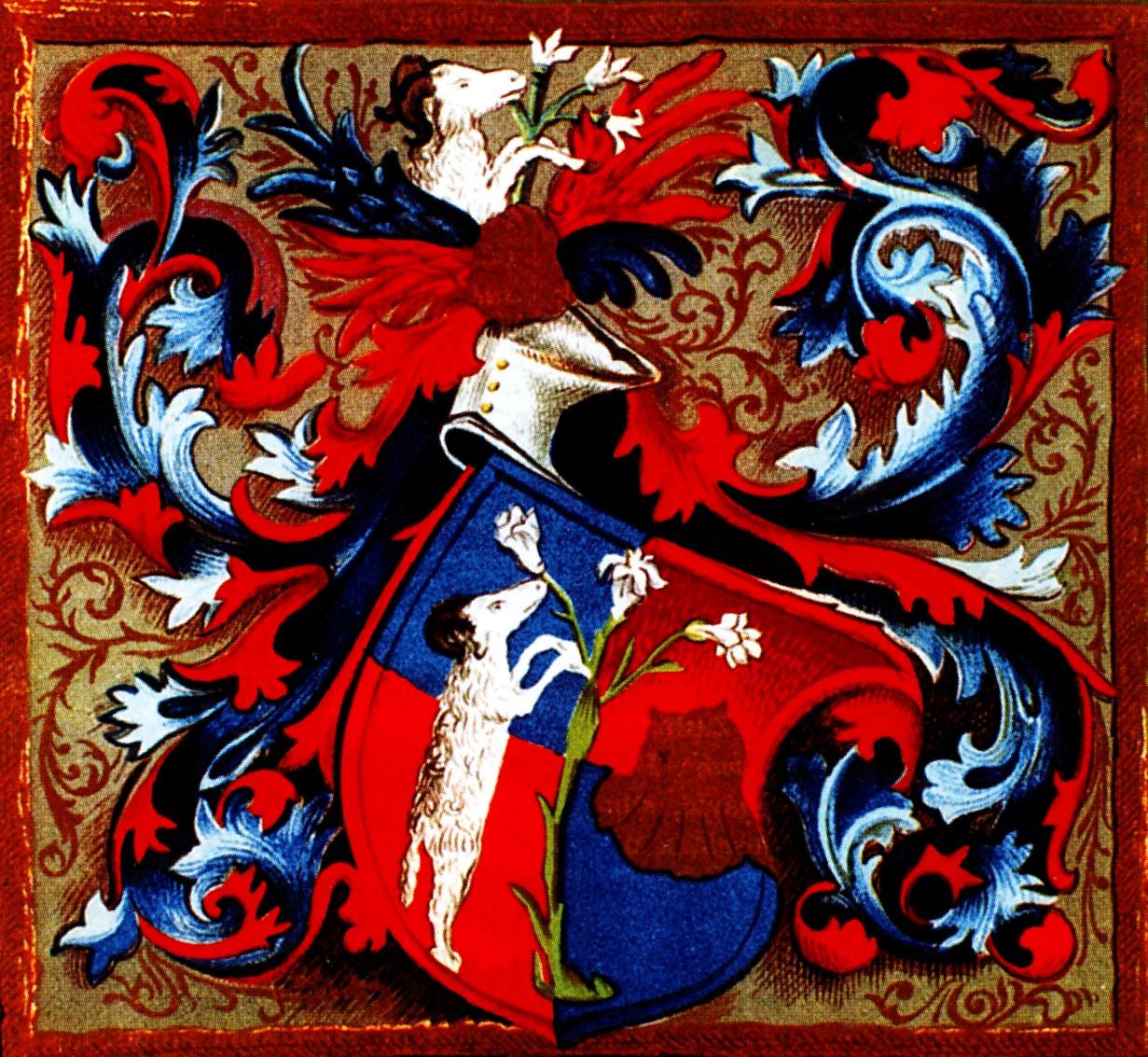
- Kossuth crest
- Pronunciation: Hungarian: [ˈkoʃut]
- Language: Hungarian, Slovak, Polish

Origin
- Language: Slavic languages
- Derivation: ko- + šutý
- Meaning: 'hornless animal', 'doe', 'roe deer'

Other names
- Alternative spelling: Kosut (phonetic respelling)
- Variant forms: Kossut, Kosuth, Košút

Kossuth and its variations are surnames of Slavic origin. Ko- is a prefix that provides emphasis to the root šutý, meaning 'hornless'.

In Slovak, košuta or košút can also mean 'a castrated goat', 'a somersault', or, in dialect, 'a bossy person'.

Notable people with this surname include

- Ferenc Kossuth (1841–1914), Hungarian civil engineer and politician
- Lajos Kossuth (1802–1894), Hungarian lawyer, journalist, politician, and Governor-President of Hungary in 1849
- Małgorzata Kossut, Polish neuroscientist
- Joseph Kosuth (born 1945), American conceptual artist
- Juraj Košút (1776–1849), Slovak nobleman and lawyer from the Kingdom of Hungary who supported the Slovak national movement
- Marek Košút (1988–2025), Slovak football striker
- Tomáš Košút (born 1990), Slovak football defender

== See also ==
- Emircan Koşut (born 1995), Turkish basketball player
