= Košúty =

Košúty Nemeskosút
- Municipality
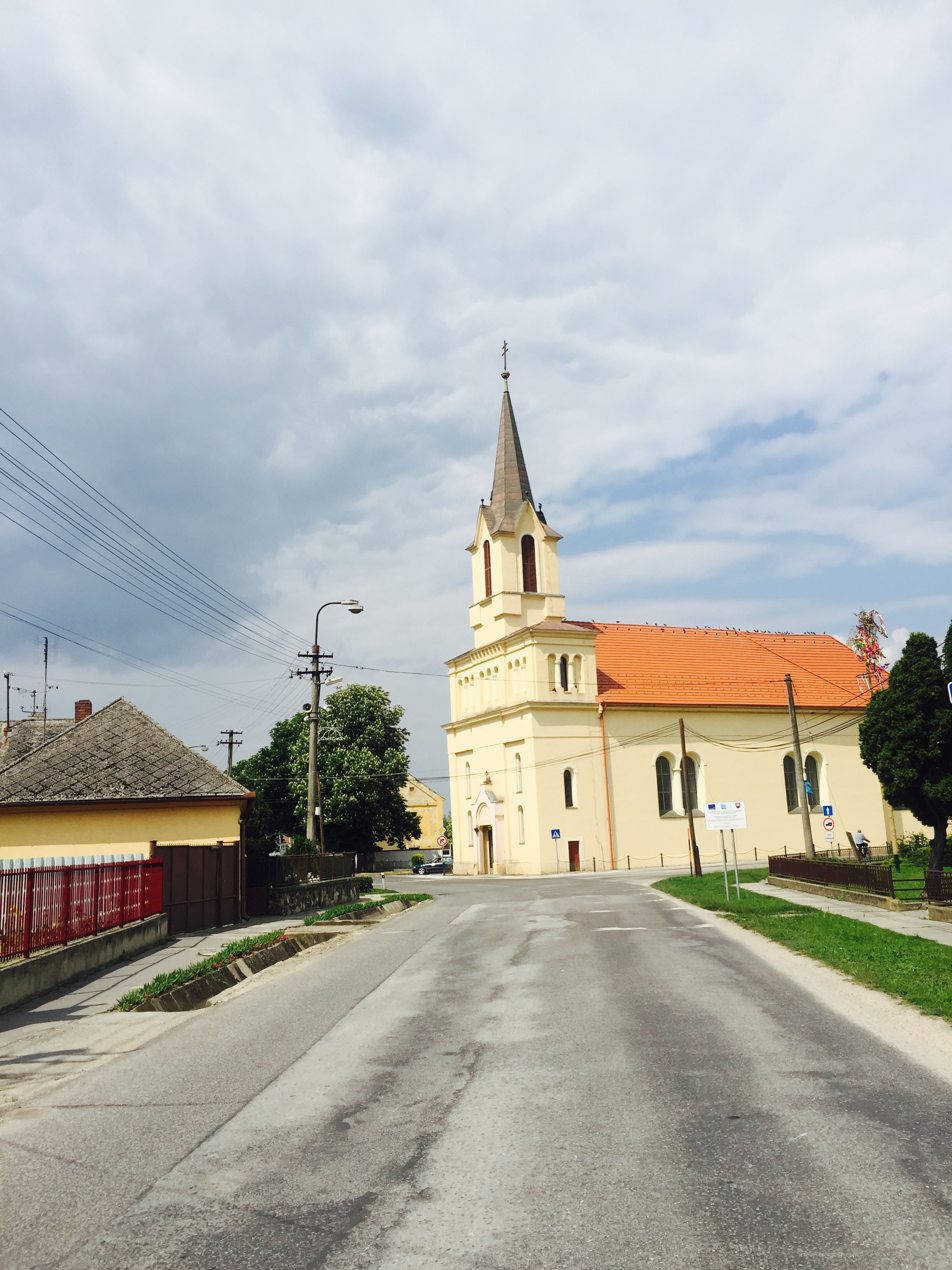

- Flag Coat of arms

- Location of Košúty in the Trnava Region Location of Košúty in Slovakia
- Coordinates: 48.17°N 17.66°E
- Country: Slovakia
- Region: Trnava Region
- District: Galanta District
- First mentioned: 1138

Government
  - Mayor: Zdenka Mačicová

Area
  - Total: 14.72 km^{2} (5.68 sq mi)
- Elevation: 120 m (390 ft)

Population (2025)
  - Total: 1,958
- Time zone: UTC+1 (CET)
  - Summer (DST): UTC+2 (CEST)
- Postal code: 925 09
- Area code: +421 31
- Vehicle registration plate (until 2022): GA
- Website: www.obeckosuty.sk

Košúty (Hungarian: Nemeskosút, until 1899 Kosút) is a village and municipality in Galanta District of the Trnava Region of south-west Slovakia.

== History ==
In the 9th century, the territory of Košúty became part of the Kingdom of Hungary. In historical records the village was first mentioned in 1138. Before the establishment of independent Czechoslovakia in 1918, it was part of Pozsony County. After the Austro-Hungarian army disintegrated in November 1918, Czechoslovak troops occupied the area, later acknowledged internationally by the Treaty of Trianon. Between 1938 and 1945 Košúty once more became part of Miklós Horthy's Hungary through the First Vienna Award. From 1945 until the Velvet Divorce, it was part of Czechoslovakia. Since then it has been part of Slovakia.

== Geography ==
The municipality lies at an altitude of 120 metres (390 ft) and covers an area of 14.72 km^{2} (5.68 sq mi) (2025).

== Population ==
Population statistic (10 years)
Year	1995	2005	2015	2025
Count	1383	1479	1630	1958
Difference		+6.94%	+10.20%	+20.12%

Population statistic
Year	2024	2025
Count	1940	1958
Difference		+0.92%

It has a population of 1958 people (31 December 2025).

=== Ethnicity ===
Census 2021 (1+ %)
Ethnicity	Number	Fraction
Slovak	1077	60.06%
Hungarian	703	39.2%
Not found out	73	4.07%
Total	1793	

In year 2021 was 1793 people by ethnicity 1077 as Slovak, 703 as Hungarian, 73 as Not found out, 15 as Czech, 6 as Romani, 3 as German, 2 as Jewish, 2 as Ukrainian, 2 as Russian, 2 as Other, 2 as Greek, 1 as Vietnamese, 1 as Serbian, 1 as Rusyn, 1 as Romanian, 1 as Polish and 1 as Croatian.

Note on population: The difference values of population numbers in the table "Population statistic" and in the sections "Ethnicity" & "Religion" is caused by the use of various statistical methods.

=== Religion ===
Census 2021 (1+ %)
Religion	Number	Fraction
Roman Catholic Church	1064	59.34%
None	543	30.28%
Not found out	69	3.85%
Evangelical Church	41	2.29%
Christian Congregations in Slovakia	25	1.39%
Total	1793	

In year 2021 was 1793 people by religion 1064 from Roman Catholic Church, 543 from None, 69 from Not found out, 41 from Evangelical Church, 25 from Christian Congregations in Slovakia, 13 from Greek Catholic Church, 10 from Apostolic Church, 6 from Calvinist Church, 4 from Eastern Orthodox Church, 4 from Other, 3 from United Methodist Church, 3 from Buddhism, 3 from Ad hoc movements, 2 from Paganism and natural spirituality, 2 from Jehovah's Witnesses and 1 from Old Catholic Church.

== Genealogical resources ==
The records for genealogical research are available at the state archive "Statny Archiv in Bratislava, Slovakia"

- Roman Catholic church records (births/marriages/deaths): 1691-1920 (parish A)
- Lutheran church records (births/marriages/deaths): 1701-1896 (parish B)

== See also ==
- List of municipalities and towns in Slovakia
