= Arthur Gold =

Arthur Gold may refer to:

- Arthur Gold (pianist) (1917–1990), Canadian pianist, author and television presenter
- Sir Arthur Gold (sports administrator) (1917–2001), British Olympic sports administrator

== See also ==
- Artur Gold (1897–1943), Polish violinist and composer
- Artie Gold (1947–2007), Canadian poet
- Arthur Gould (disambiguation)
