= Arthur Gould =

Arthur Gould may refer to:

- Arthur Corbin Gould (1850–1903), American shooter and writer on guns
- Arthur R. Gould (1857–1946), United States Senator
- Arthur Gould (rugby union) (1864–1919), Welsh rugby union player
- Arthur Gould (wrestler) (1892–1948), British Olympic wrestler
- Arthur L. Gould, American educator

== See also ==
- Arthur Gold (disambiguation)
- Artur Gold (1897–1943), Polish violinist and composer
- Arthur Gould-Porter (1905–1987), British actor
