= Jankiel Wiernik =

Polish holocaust survivor

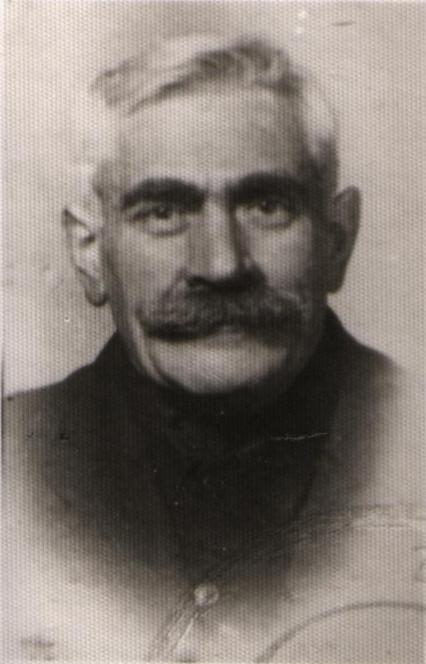
- Born: 1889; Biała Podlaska, Congress Poland, Russian Empire
- Died: 1972 (aged 82–83); Rishon LeZion, Israel
- Resting place: Israel
- Occupation: Master carpenter
- Known for: Participation in the uprising of Treblinka and testimony at the Eichmann trial

Jankiel (Yankel, Yaakov, or Jacob) Wiernik (Hebrew: יעקב ויירניק; 1889–1972) was a Polish-Jewish Holocaust survivor who was an influential figure in the Treblinka extermination camp resistance. He had been forced to work as a Sonderkommando slave worker there, where an estimated 700,000–900,000 people, mostly Jews, were murdered. After his escape during the uprising of 2 August 1943, Wiernik reached Warsaw and joined the resistance. He also wrote a clandestine account of the camp's operation, A Year in Treblinka, which was copied and translated for printing in London and the US in English and Yiddish.

Following World War II, Wiernik testified at Ludwig Fischer's trial in 1947. He left Poland, emigrating first to Sweden and then to the new state of Israel. In 1961, he testified at Adolf Eichmann's trial in Jerusalem. He returned to Poland in 1964, to attend the opening of the Treblinka Memorial. Wiernik died in Israel in 1972 at the age of 83.

== Life ==
Wiernik grew up and lived with his family in Kobryń, Poland (then part of the Russian Empire), where he followed his father in becoming a master cabinetmaker. To avoid competition with artisan family members (Natan Wiernik) who were also master cabinetmakers, they moved to Biała Podlaska.

From 1904 Jankiel Wiernik was a member of the Bund movement. He lived in Warsaw and worked as a property manager at a house owned by the family of Stefan Krzywoszewski (1886-1950), a popular writer, publisher and theatre director in the Interbellum.

When World War II began with the 1939 invasion of Poland, Wiernik was 50 years old. In late 1940 the German Nazis created the Warsaw Ghetto, and Wiernik was forced to relocate there along with all Polish Jews in the capital. He was transported to Treblinka on 23 August 1942, during the murderous Grossaktion Warsaw. Following his successful escape from the extermination camp in August 1943, he was rescued by the Krzywoszewski family.

=== Treblinka ===
On his arrival at Treblinka aboard the Holocaust train from Warsaw, Wiernik was selected to work as a Sonderkommando; otherwise he would have been immediately gassed and killed that day. Wiernik's first job with the Sonderkommando required him to drag corpses from the gas chambers to mass graves. He was traumatized by his experiences and later wrote in his book: "It often happened that an arm or a leg fell off when we tied straps around them in order to drag the bodies away."

He remembered the horrors of the enormous pyres, where "10,000 to 12,000 corpses were cremated at one time." He wrote: "The bodies of women were used for kindling" while Germans "toasted the scene with brandy and with the choicest liqueurs, ate, caroused and had a great time warming themselves by the fire." Wiernik described small children waiting so long in the cold for their turn in the gas chambers that "their feet froze and stuck to the icy ground" and noted one guard who would "frequently snatch a child from the woman's arms and either tear the child in half or grab it by the legs, smash its head against a wall and throw the body away." At other times "children were snatched from their mothers' arms and tossed into the flames alive."

He was also encouraged by occasional scenes of brave resistance. In chapter 8, he describes seeing a naked woman escape the clutches of the guards and leap over a three-metre high barbed wire fence unscathed. When accosted by a Ukrainian guard (Trawniki) on the other side, she wrestled his machine gun out of his grasp, killed the guard, and shot another guard before being killed herself.

When the SS recognized that Wiernik was a professional carpenter, they put him to work constructing various camp structures, including additional gas chambers. Given his skills, Wiernik was not subjected to the same treatment as others and no longer had to handle dead bodies. He attributed his survival to being able to build structures needed in the camp. Given the shortage of skilled construction workers accustomed to the killing process, Wiernik moved between the two divisions of the camp frequently. As a result, he became an important contact between the camp zones when the revolt was being planned.

== Escape ==
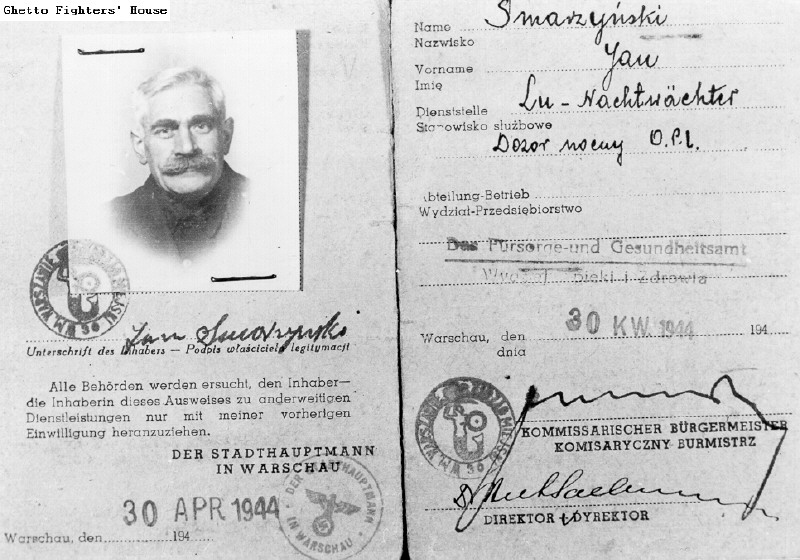
Counterfeit Kennkarte of Jankiel Wiernik under the assumed name of Jan Smarzyński.

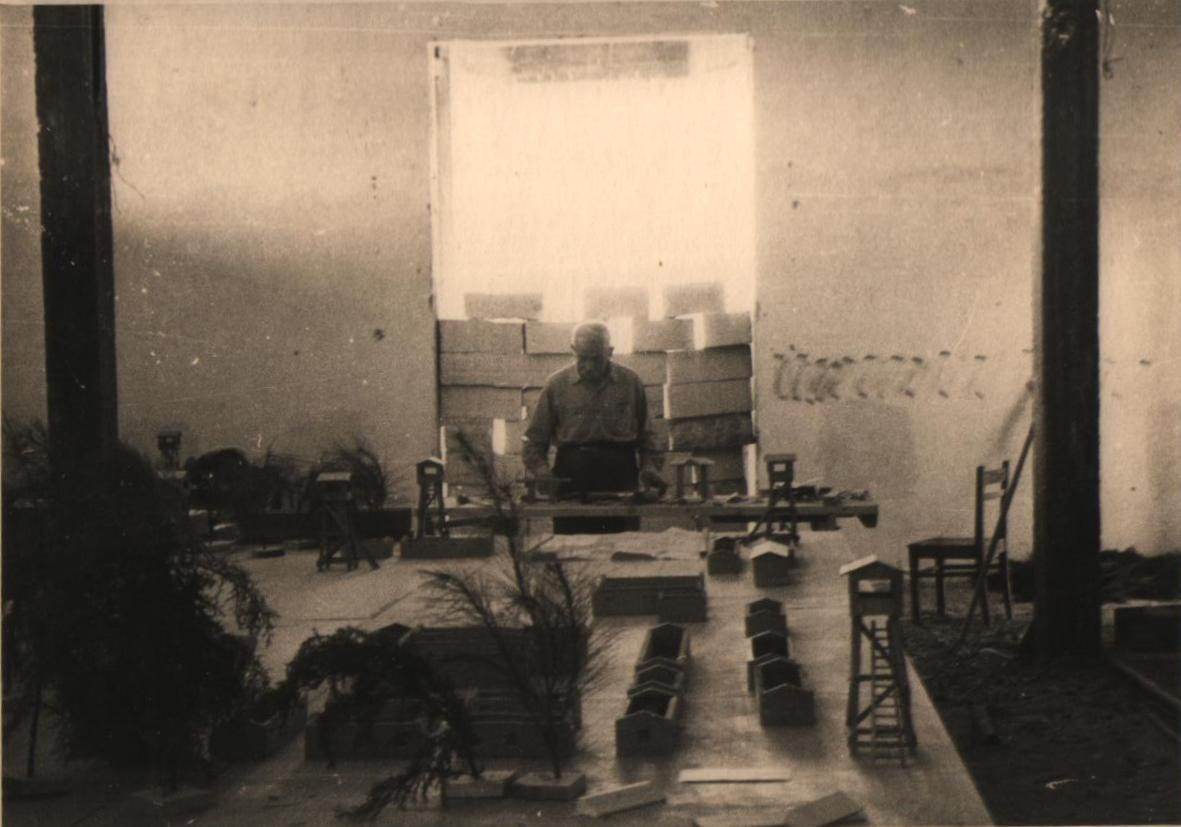
Jankiel Wiernik building a model of the Treblinka death camp

Wiernik escaped Treblinka during the revolt of the prisoners on "a sizzling hot day" of August 2, 1943. A shot fired into the air signalled that the revolt was on. Wiernik wrote that he "grabbed some guns" and, after spotting an opportunity to make a break for the woods, an axe. A camp guard in pursuit shot Wiernik with a pistol but the bullet did not penetrate his skin. Wiernik said he turned around and killed his pursuer with the axe. Wiernik continued to Warsaw, hiding in a freight train.

He hid in Warsaw, secreted initially by the Polish family of Krzywoszewski, his former employers. They got him false papers, a Kennkarte in the name of Kowalczyk. Next, Wiernik assumed the name of Jan Smarzyński. He made contact with members of the Jewish underground working in the 'Aryan' part of Warsaw. They realized he was a valuable eyewitness of the extermination process in Treblinka. He was persuaded in late 1943 to write A Year in Treblinka, in spite of his initial reluctance (Wiernik had little education and was not a skilled writer). He continued to live in Warsaw in relative comfort, believing that his 'Aryan' appearance allowed him to do so.

He took part in the 1944 Warsaw Uprising, fighting in the Armia Ludowa. After the end of World War II, Wiernik initially remained in Poland (in 1947 he testified in the trial of Ludwig Fischer). He emigrated to Sweden and afterwards to the newly founded state of Israel.

There in the 1950s, Wiernik built a model of the Treblinka camp. It is displayed in the Ghetto Fighters' House museum in Israel. In 1961 Wiernik testified in the Eichmann trial in Israel.

Wiernik suffered the after-effects of trauma from his time in the camp. His feeling of survivor's guilt was expressed in chapter one of A Year in Treblinka. "I sacrificed all those nearest and dearest to me. I myself took them to the place of execution. I built their death chambers for them." He said that he had nightmares and had trouble sleeping. Apparently, the horrors he had experienced in Treblinka had caused him to suffer from survivor syndrome, a form of post-traumatic stress disorder.

== A Year in Treblinka ==
Jankiel Wiernik published Rok w Treblince (A Year in Treblinka) in 1944 as a clandestine booklet. It was printed through the efforts of the Jewish National Committee (Żydowski Komitet Narodowy, ŻKN), Bund (underground organizations of the remnants of Polish Jews), and the Polish Council to Aid Jews Żegota by means of an underground printer organized by Ferdynand Arczyński. The circulation was estimated by Władysław Bartoszewski as 2,000 copies. It was sent through Polish underground channels to London, and translated into English and Yiddish. It was also printed in the US by American representatives of the General Jewish Workers Union of Poland. It was printed in the British Mandate of Palestine by the Histadrut in December 1944, translated into Hebrew by Icchak Cukierman. The book recounts his experiences in the Treblinka extermination camp between 1942 and 1943.

== See also ==
- Chil Rajchman, Treblinka revolt survivor, author of a memoir The Last Jew of Treblinka (1945)
- Richard Glazar, author of memoir Trap with a Green Fence: Survival in Treblinka (1992)
- Operation Reinhard, the most deadly phase of The Final Solution
- Wannsee Conference of January 20, 1942
- The Holocaust in Poland

== Sources ==
- Yankel Wiernik (1945), A Year in Treblinka: An Inmate who Escaped Tells the Day-to-day Facts of One Year of His Torturous Experience, New York: digitized by Zchor.org, OCLC 233992530, "Complete text, 14 chapters."
- Testimony of Jankiel Wiernik, in "Chronicles of Terror" testimony database
