= Zdzisław Łukaszkiewicz =

Polish judge and researcher

Judge Zdzisław Łukaszkiewicz was a member of the Main Commission for the Investigation of Nazi Crimes in Poland (Polish: Główna Komisja Badania Zbrodni Hitlerowskich w Polsce) upon the conclusion of World War II. The Commission has been replaced, upon the collapse of the Soviet-imposed communism in Poland, with the government-affiliated Institute of National Remembrance (IPN) serving similar purpose at present. Łukaszkiewicz was the author of the first historical research into the Nazi German extermination camps including Majdanek and Treblinka, on the territory of occupied Poland during the genocidal Operation Reinhard of the Holocaust.

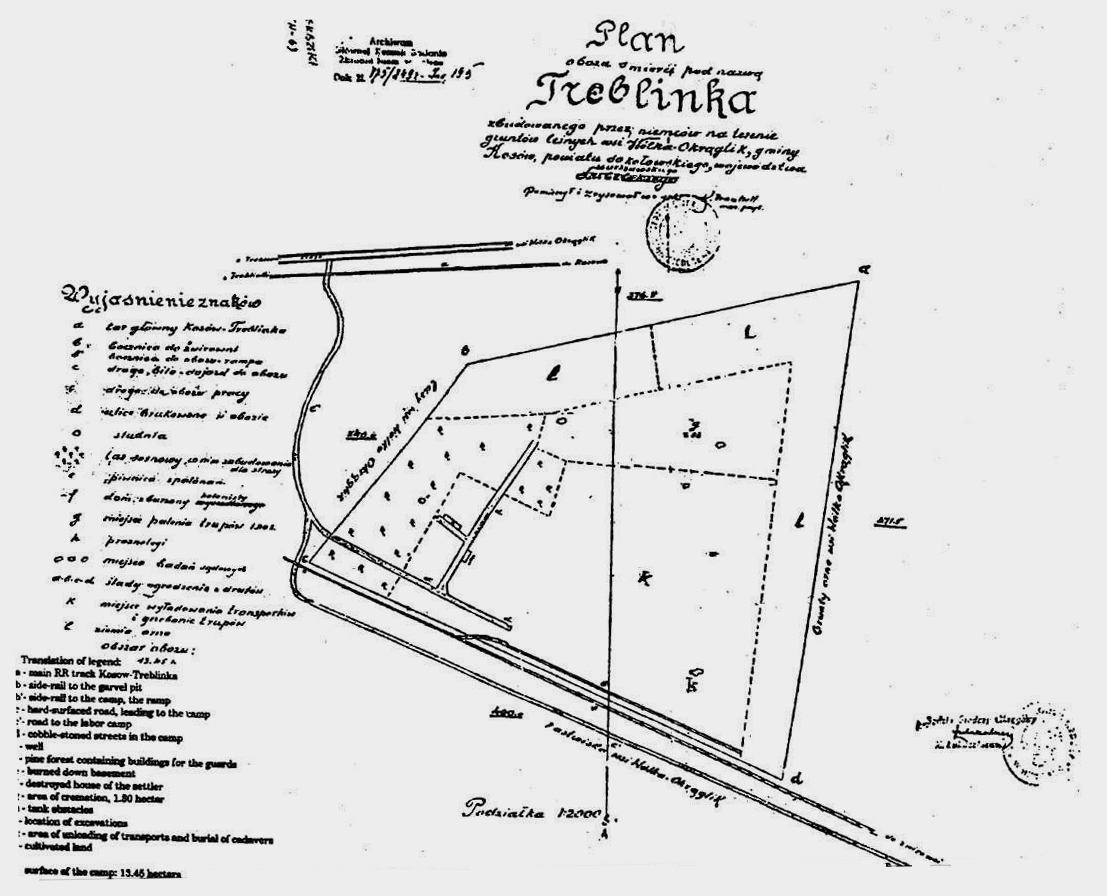
Plan of Treblinka drawn in 1945 by surveyor T. Trautsolt; with the rubber stamp of the Main Commission for the Investigation of Nazi Crimes in Poland (or District Court, illegible), and signed by Łukaszkiewicz. Simplified version (with already typed legend) was published in his book titled Obóz straceń w Treblince by PIW, Warsaw, 1946.

== Holocaust research ==
Łukaszkiewicz conducted his research at the time when virtually nothing was known about the scale and the exact way in which these atrocities were committed. He published his first findings already in 1946 along with the results of legal and medical inquiries, sworn affidavits of land surveyor T. Trautsolt, Dr H. Wakulicz, the evidence collected by railway workers but most importantly, the testimonies of former prisoners of Treblinka extermination camp who managed to survive the revolt and took part in the Commission's forensic work. Łukaszkiewicz examined the selected graves exhumed at Treblinka I Arbeitslager. His estimate of the total number of the victims of gassing was based on the already proven record of 156 transports with an average of 5,000 prisoners each. Many published results of his enquiries are still considered paramount to the understanding of the Final Solution, even though some specifics have also been revised by modern science. Łukaszkiewicz is being quoted by the Encyclopedia of the Holocaust, the Britannica Polish edition, and the Polish Nowa Encyklopedia Powszechna PWN among others. Also, many professional historians including Wolfgang Scheffler and Czesław Rajca used his publications as the source of pertinent data.

=== Challenges ===
Łukaszkiewicz was the first Polish researcher to study the 1943 massacre committed at the Majdanek concentration camp under the codename Operation Erntefest. The more substantial revisions to his early research (published in 1948) have been made only in the 1960s and 1970s, when the first testimonies of the Holocaust perpetrators appeared in German court documents during trials.

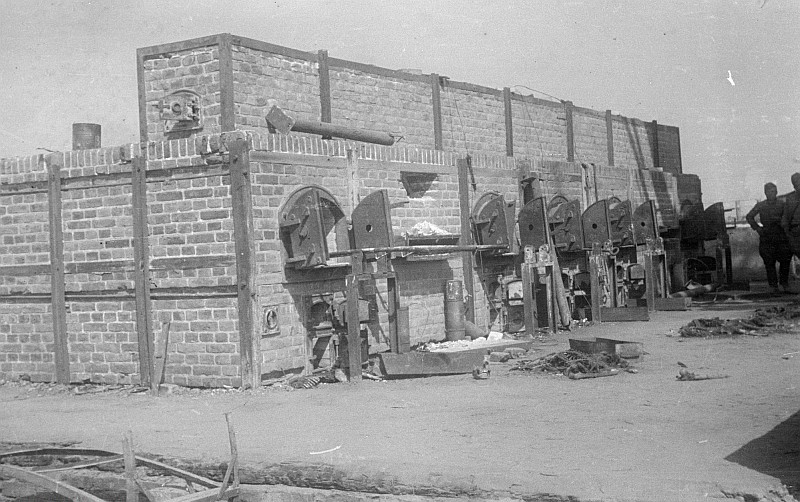
Majdanek crematoria upon liberation, inside an already dismantled building

Although his research was further revised by Holocaust scholars, Łukaszkiewicz was the first Polish scientist to challenge the evidence for the prosecution submitted in 1946 by the Soviets at the International Military Tribunal (IMT) at Nuremberg. The completely unrealistic estimate of 1.5 million people murdered at the Majdanek concentration camp was based on the theoretical capacity of Majdanek coke-fueled crematoria. This number claimed by the Soviet-led Special Commission was lowered by Łukaszkiewicz by over one million victims based on his own evidence, down to 360,000 which – at that particular time – constituted a challenge requiring a substantial amount of personal integrity.

== Selected works ==
- "Obóz zagłady Treblinka" (The Extermination Camp Treblinka) by Zdzisław Łukaszkiewicz, a thirty-page article in: Biuletyn Głównej Komisji Badania Zbrodni Hitlerowskich w Polsce, I, 1946.
- Obóz straceń w Treblince by Zdzisław Łukaszkiewicz (book), published by Państwowy Instytut Wydawniczy, 1946 in Polish, 5 editions, OCLC 79768503
- Hitlerowskie obozy koncentracyjne (Nazi Concentration Camps) by Zdzisław Łukaszkiewicz (book), published by Polski Instytut Spraw Międzynarodowych, 1955 in Polish, 3 editions OCLC 659792693 ISSN 0519-9034
- Regulamin czynności sądów wojewódzkich i powiatowych w sprawach cywilnych i karnych by Z. Łukaszkiewicz with Tadeusz Górski; Janusz Pietrzykowski [u.a.] (book), 1 edition published in 1956 in Polish
- Chuligaństwo by Z. Łukaszkiewicz with J. Sawicki, G. Auscaler, A. Pawełczyńska, T. Cyprian. Ed. by J. Sawicki (book), 1 edition published in 1956 in Polish
- Obóz koncentracyjny i zagłady Majdanek by Zdzisław Łukaszkiewicz (book), Biuletyn Głównej Komisji Badania Zbrodni Niemieckich” 1948, vol. 4, in Polish, OCLC 42357118

== See also ==
- Majdanek trials
