= Treblinka extermination camp =

Nazi extermination camp in Poland (1942–1943)

Treblinka
- Extermination camp
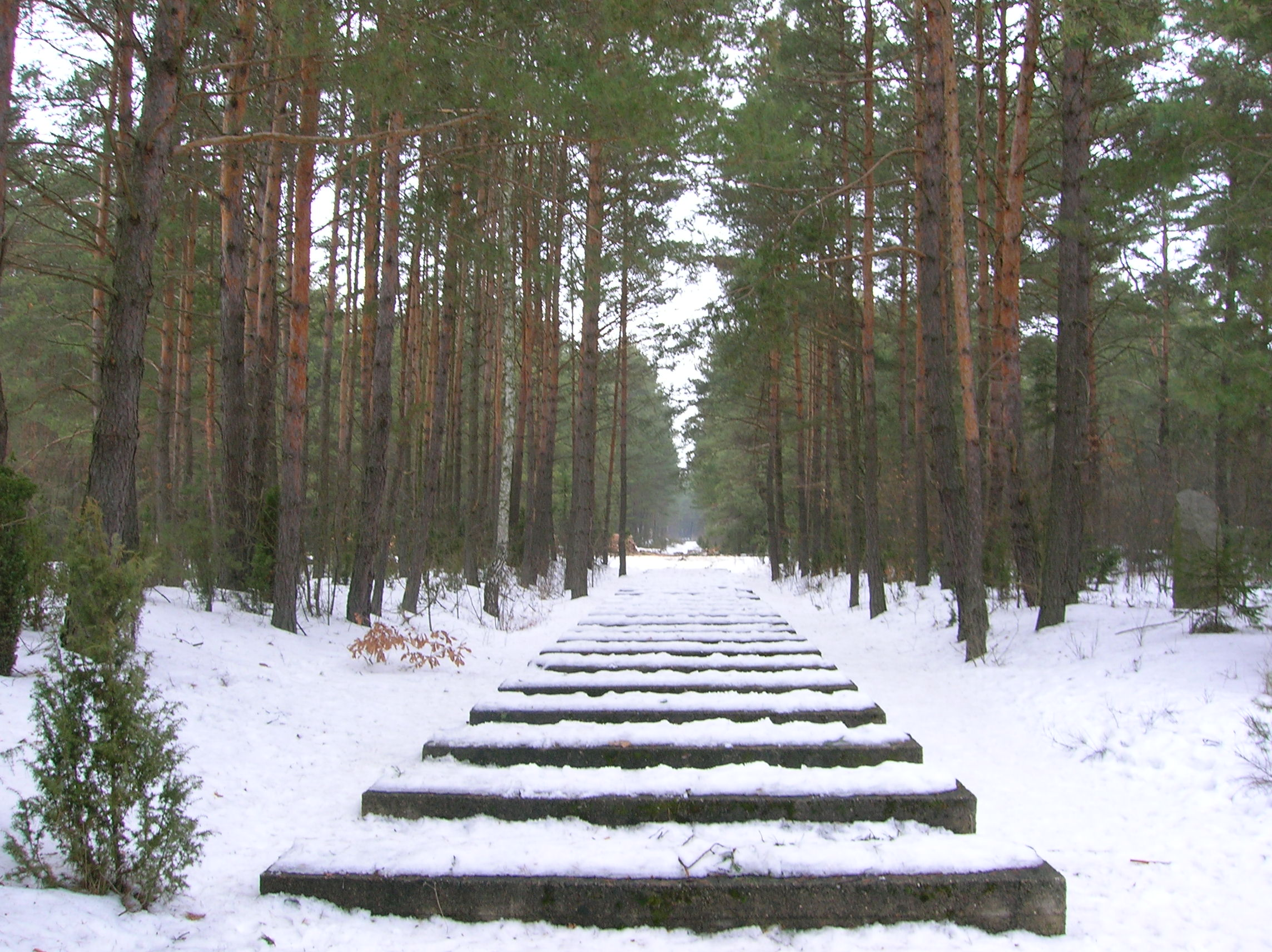
- Concrete blocks marking the path of the former railway spur at Treblinka

- Location within Poland Location within Central Europe
- Coordinates: 52°37′52″N 22°03′11″E
- Known for: Genocide during the Holocaust
- Location: Near Treblinka, General Government (German-occupied Poland)
- Built by: Richard Thomalla (death camp); Erwin Lambert (gas chambers); Christian Wirth; Schönbronn Company, Leipzig; Schmidt–Münstermann, Warsaw branch
- Operated by: SS-Totenkopfverbände
- Commandant: Irmfried Eberl (11 July 1942 – 26 August 1942); Franz Stangl (1 September 1942 – August 1943); Kurt Franz (August 1943 – November 1943)
- Original use: Extermination camp
- First built: April 1942 – July 1942
- Operational: 23 July 1942 – October 1943
- Number of gas chambers: 6
- Inmates: Jews (mostly Polish), Romani people
- Number of inmates: Est. 1,000
- Killed: Est. 800,000–925,000
- Liberated by: Closed in late 1943
- Notable inmates: Richard Glazar; Artur Gold; Janusz Korczak; Chil Rajchman; Jankiel Wiernik (Note: Yitzhak Arad gives his name as Jacob Wiernik.); Samuel Willenberg
- Notable books: A Year in Treblinka; Into That Darkness; Old and New Memories; Revolt in Treblinka; Trap with a Green Fence; The Last Jew of Treblinka

Treblinka (Polish: [trɛˈbliŋ.ka]; German: [tʁeˈblɪŋka]) was the second-deadliest extermination camp to be built and operated by Nazi Germany in occupied Poland during World War II, second only to Auschwitz. It was in a forest north-east of Warsaw, four kilometres (2 1/2 miles) south of the village of Treblinka in what is now the Masovian Voivodeship. The camp operated between 23 July 1942 and 19 October 1943 as part of Operation Reinhard, the deadliest phase of the Final Solution. During this time, it is estimated that between 800,000 and 925,000 Jews were murdered in its gas chambers, along with 2,000 Romani people. More Jews were murdered at Treblinka than at any other Nazi extermination camp apart from Auschwitz-Birkenau.

Managed by the German SS with assistance from Trawniki guards – recruited from among Soviet POWs to serve with the Germans – the camp consisted of two separate units. Treblinka I was a forced-labour camp (Arbeitslager) whose prisoners worked in the gravel pit or irrigation area and in the forest, where they cut wood to fuel the cremation pits. Between 1941 and 1944, more than half of its 20,000 inmates were murdered via shootings, hunger, disease and mistreatment.

The second camp, Treblinka II, was an extermination camp (Vernichtungslager), referred to euphemistically as the SS-Sonderkommando Treblinka by the Nazis. A small number of Jewish men who were not murdered immediately upon arrival became members of its Sonderkommando whose jobs included being forced to bury the victims' bodies in mass graves. These bodies were exhumed in 1943 and cremated on large open-air pyres along with the bodies of new victims. Gassing operations at Treblinka II ended in October 1943 following a revolt by the prisoners in early August. Several Trawniki guards were killed and 200 prisoners escaped from the camp; almost a hundred survived the subsequent pursuit. The camp was dismantled in late 1943. A farmhouse for a watchman was built on the site and the ground ploughed over in an attempt to hide the evidence of genocide.

In the postwar Polish People's Republic, the government bought most of the land where the camp had stood, and built a large stone memorial there between 1959 and 1962. In 1964, Treblinka was declared a national monument of Jewish martyrdom (Note: "Place of martyrology" is a calque borrowed from the popular Polish phrase "Miejsce Martyrologii Żydów", which was introduced by the Act of Parliament (Sejm) on 2 July 1947 in Warsaw.) in a ceremony at the site of the former gas chambers. In the same year, the first German trials were held regarding the crimes committed at Treblinka by former SS members. After the end of communism in Poland in 1989, the number of visitors coming to Treblinka from abroad increased. An exhibition centre at the camp opened in 2006. It was later expanded and made into a branch of the Siedlce Regional Museum.

== Background ==
Following the invasion of Poland in 1939, most of the 3.5 million Polish Jews were rounded up and confined to newly established ghettos by the Nazis. The system was intended to isolate the Jews from the outside world in order to facilitate their exploitation and abuse. The supply of food was inadequate, living conditions were cramped and unsanitary, and Jews had no way to earn money. Malnutrition and lack of medicine led to soaring mortality rates. In 1941, the initial victories of the Wehrmacht (Note: Wehrmacht is German for "Defence Force". It was the name of the armed forces of Germany from 1935 to 1945.) over the Soviet Union inspired plans for the German colonisation of occupied Poland, including all territory within the new district of General Government. At the Wannsee Conference held near Berlin on 20 January 1942, new plans were outlined for the genocide of Jews, known as the "Final Solution" to the Jewish Question. The extermination programme was codenamed Operation Reinhard, (Note: The operation was named in honour of Reinhard Heydrich, Himmler's deputy and predecessor as head of the Reich Security Main Office. Heydrich died in a Czech hospital, a few days after being wounded in an attack by members of the Czech resistance on 27 May 1942.) and was separate from the Einsatzgruppen mass-murder operations in Eastern Europe, in which half a million Jews had already been murdered.

Treblinka was one of three secret extermination camps set up for Operation Reinhard; the other two were Bełżec and Sobibór. All three were equipped with gas chambers disguised as shower rooms, for the murder of entire transports of people. The method was established following a pilot project of mobile extermination conducted at Soldau and at Chełmno extermination camp that began operating in 1941 and used gas vans. Chełmno (German: Kulmhof) was a testing ground for the establishment of faster methods of murdering and incinerating bodies. It was not a part of Reinhard, which was marked by the construction of stationary facilities for mass murder. Treblinka was the third extermination camp of Operation Reinhard to be built, following Bełżec and Sobibór, and incorporated lessons learned from their construction. Alongside the Reinhard camps, mass-murder facilities using Zyklon B were developed at the Majdanek concentration camp in March 1942, and at Auschwitz II-Birkenau between March and June.

Nazi plans to murder Polish Jews from across the General Government during Aktion Reinhard were overseen in occupied Poland by Odilo Globocnik, a deputy of Heinrich Himmler, head of the SS, in Berlin. The Operation Reinhard camps reported directly to Himmler. The staff of Operation Reinhard, most of whom had been involved in the Action T4 "involuntary euthanasia" programme, used T4 as a framework for the construction of new facilities. Most of the Jews who were murdered in the Reinhard camps came from ghettos. The Operation Reinhard camps reported directly to Himmler, and not to the concentration camps inspector Richard Glücks.

=== Location ===
Treblinka in occupied Poland with Nazi extermination camps marked with black and white skulls. General Government territory: centre. District of Galicia: lower–right. Upper Silesia with Auschwitz: lower–left.

The two parallel camps of Treblinka were built 80 km (50 mi) northeast of Warsaw. Before World War II, it was the location of a gravel mining enterprise for the production of concrete, connected to most of the major cities in central Poland by the Małkinia–Sokołów Podlaski railway junction and the Treblinka village station. The mine was owned and operated by the Polish industrialist Marian Łopuszyński, who added the new 6 km (3.7 mi) railway track to the existing line. When the German SS took over Treblinka I, the quarry was already equipped with heavy machinery that was ready to use. Treblinka was well-connected but isolated enough, (Note: All three Reinhard camps (Bełżec, Sobibór and Treblinka) were built in rural forest complexes of the General Government to hide their existence and complete the illusion that they were transit points for deportations to the east.) halfway between some of the largest Jewish ghettos in Nazi-occupied Europe, including the Warsaw Ghetto and the Białystok Ghetto, the capital of the newly formed Bialystok District. The Warsaw Ghetto had 500,000 Jewish inmates, and the Białystok Ghetto had about 60,000.

Treblinka was divided into two separate camps 2 km (1.2 mi) apart. Two engineering firms, the Schönbronn Company of Leipzig and the Warsaw branch of Schmidt–Münstermann, oversaw the construction of both camps. Between 1942 and 1943, the extermination centre was further redeveloped with a crawler excavator. New gas chambers constructed of brick and cement mortar were freshly erected, and mass cremation pyres were also introduced. The perimeter was enlarged to provide a buffer zone, making it impossible to approach the camp from the outside. The number of trains caused panic among the residents of nearby settlements. They would likely have been killed if caught near the railway tracks.

=== Treblinka I ===
Opened on 1 September 1941 as a forced-labour camp (Arbeitslager), Treblinka I replaced an ad hoc company established in June 1941 by Sturmbannführer Ernst Gramss. A new barracks and barbed wire fencing 2 m (6 ft 7 in) high were erected in late 1941. To obtain the workforce for Treblinka I, civilians were sent to the camp en masse for real or imagined offences, and sentenced to hard labour by the Gestapo office in Sokołów, which was headed by Gramss. The average length of a sentence was six months, but many prisoners had their sentences extended indefinitely. Twenty thousand people passed through Treblinka I during its three-year existence. About half of them were murdered there via exhaustion, hunger and disease. Those who survived were released after serving their sentences; these were generally Poles from nearby villages.

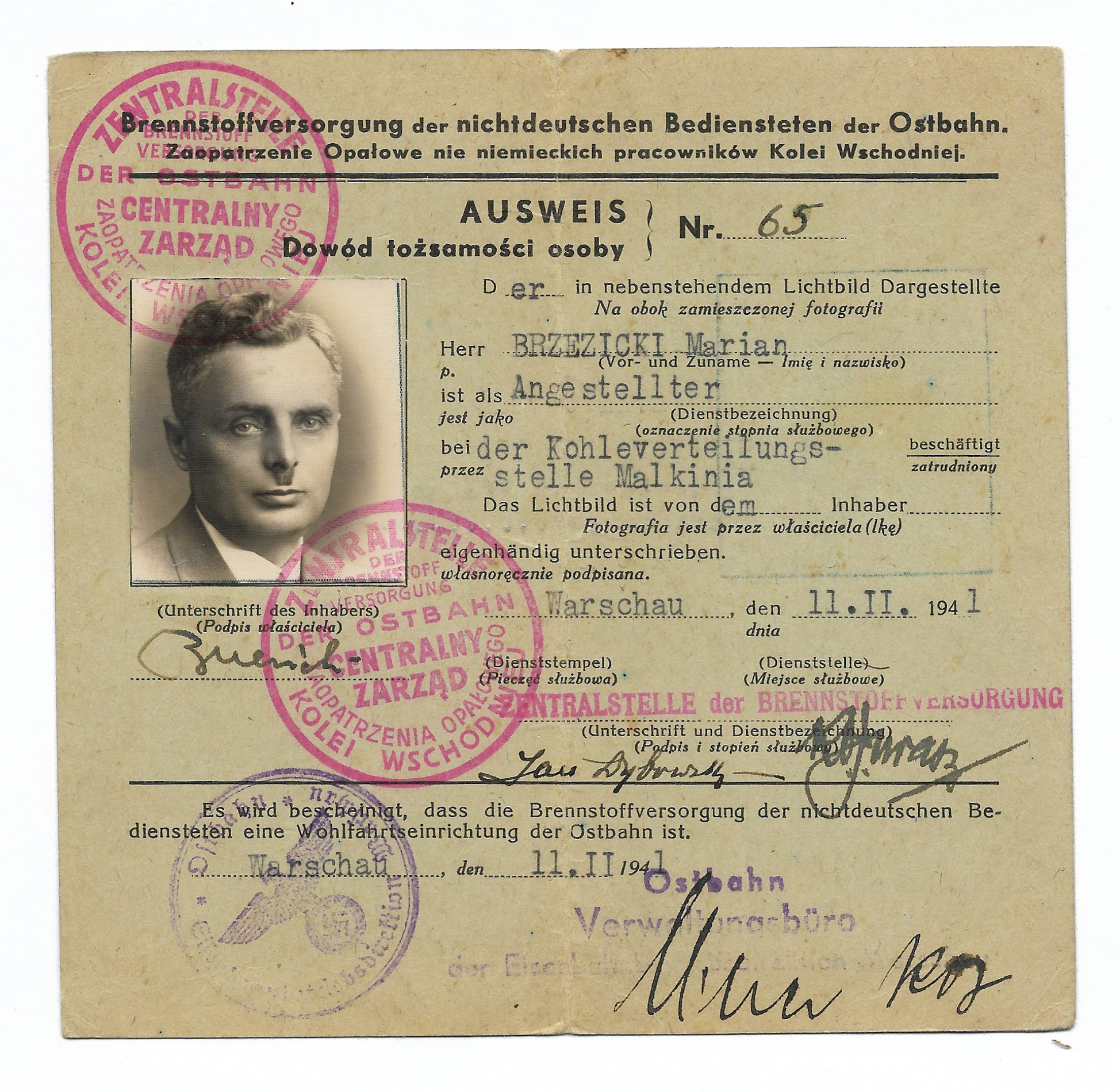
German ID issued to a worker who was posted to the Malkinia train station near Treblinka. He was in charge of supplying coal to the trains going to and leaving from the death camp.

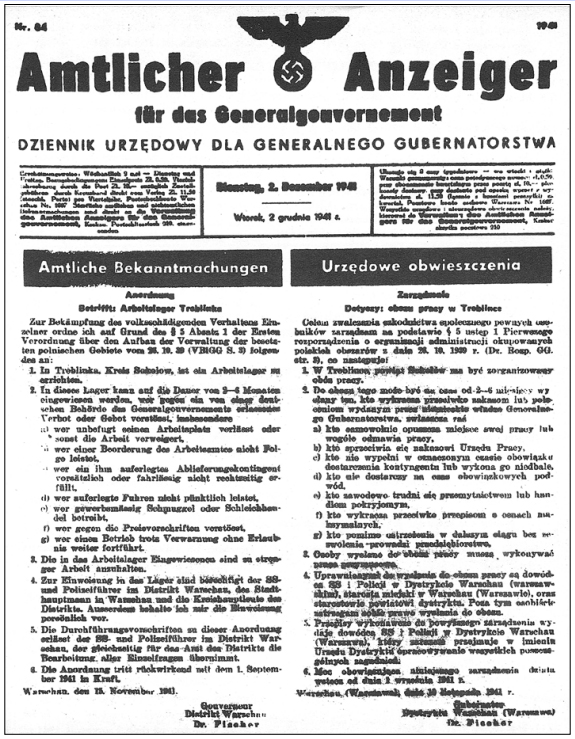
Official announcement of the founding of Treblinka I, the forced-labour camp

At any given time, Treblinka I had a workforce of 1,000–2,000 prisoners, most of whom worked 12- to 14-hour shifts in the large quarry and later also harvested wood from the nearby forest as fuel for the open-air crematoria in Treblinka II. There were German, Czech and French Jews among them, as well as Poles captured in łapankas, (Note: Lapanka is Polish for "roundup" and in this situation refers to the widespread German practice of capturing non-German civilians ambushed at random.) farmers unable to deliver food requisitions, hostages trapped by chance, and people who attempted to harbour Jews outside the Jewish ghettos or who performed restricted actions without permits. Beginning in July 1942, Jews and non-Jews were separated. Women mainly worked in the sorting barracks, where they repaired and cleaned military clothing delivered by freight trains, while most of the men worked at the gravel mine. There were no work uniforms, and inmates who lost their own shoes were forced to go barefoot or scavenge them from dead prisoners. Water was rationed, and punishments were regularly delivered at roll-calls. From December 1943 the inmates were no longer carrying any specific sentences. The camp operated officially until 23 July 1944, when the imminent arrival of Soviet forces led to its abandonment.

During its entire operation, Treblinka I's commandant was Sturmbannführer Theodor van Eupen. He ran the camp with several SS men and almost 100 Hiwi guards. The quarry, spread over an area of 17 ha (42 acres), supplied road construction material for German military use and was part of the strategic road-building programme in the war with the Soviet Union. It was equipped with a mechanical digger for shared use by both Treblinka I and II. Eupen worked closely with the SS and German police commanders in Warsaw during the deportation of Jews in early 1943 and had prisoners brought to him from the Warsaw Ghetto for the necessary replacements. According to Franciszek Ząbecki, the local station master, Eupen often murdered prisoners by "taking shots at them, as if they were partridges". A widely feared overseer was Untersturmführer Franz Schwarz, who killed prisoners with a pickaxe or hammer.

=== Treblinka II ===
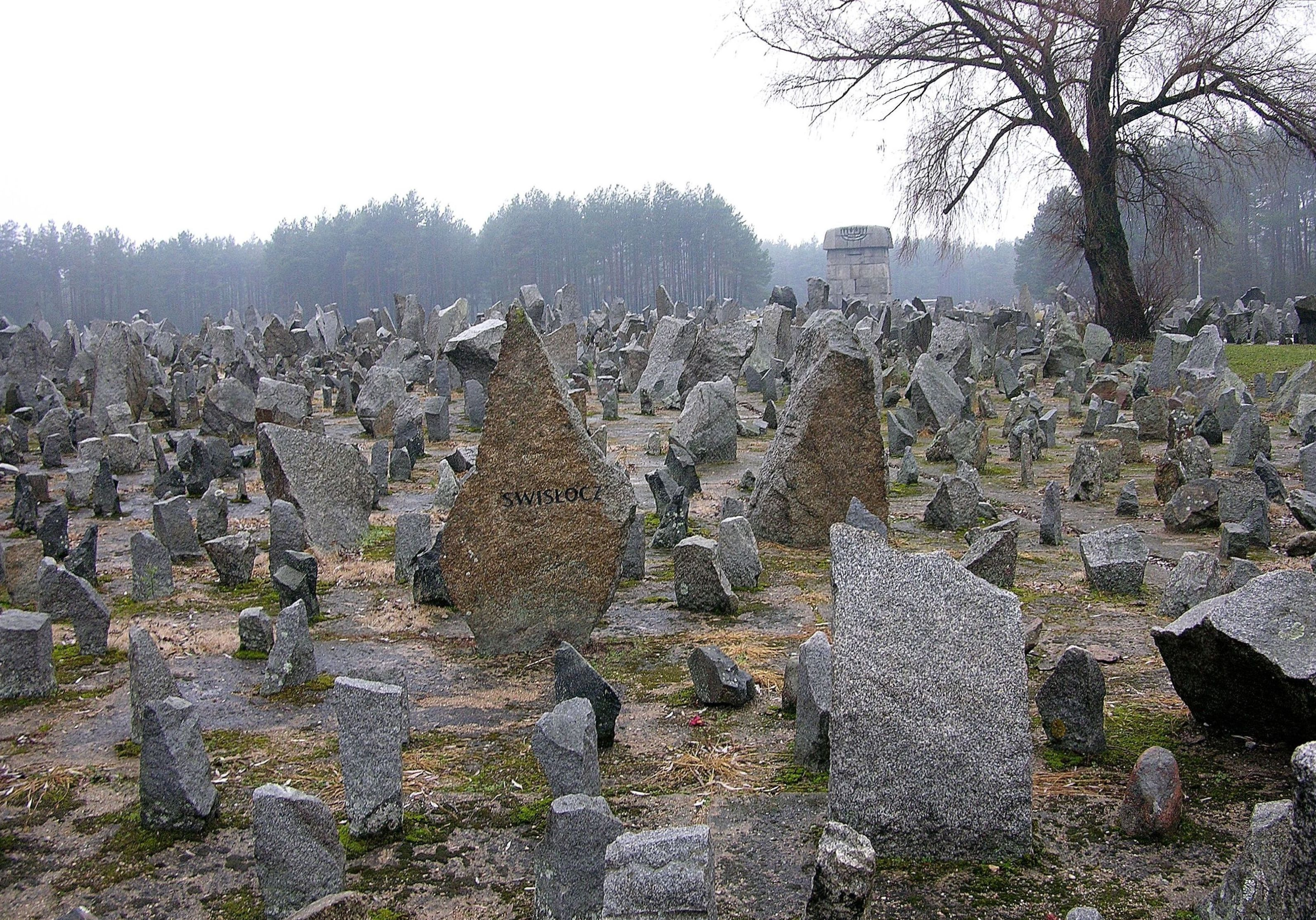
Memorial at Treblinka II, with 17,000 quarry stones symbolising gravestones. Inscriptions indicate places of Holocaust train departures, which carried at least 5,000 victims each, and selected ghettos from across Poland.

Treblinka II (officially the SS-Sonderkommando Treblinka) was divided into three parts: Camp 1 was the administrative compound where the guards lived, Camp 2 was the receiving area where incoming transports of prisoners were offloaded, and Camp 3 was the location of the gas chambers. (Note: The order was reversed by Yankel (Jankiel) Wiernik in his book A Year in Treblinka (1945); he named the receiving area of Treblinka II as Camp 1, and the gassing zone (where he worked) as Camp 2.) All three parts were built by two groups of German Jews recently expelled from Berlin and Hanover and imprisoned at the Warsaw Ghetto (a total of 238 men from 17 to 35 years of age). Hauptsturmführer Richard Thomalla, the head of construction, brought in German Jews because they could speak German. Construction began on 10 April 1942, when Bełżec and Sobibór were already in operation. The entire death camp, which was either 17 ha (42 acres) or 13.5 ha (33 acres) in size (sources vary), was surrounded by two rows of barbed-wire fencing 2.5 m (8 ft 2 in) high. This fence was later woven with pine tree branches to obstruct the view of the camp from outside. More Jews were brought in from surrounding settlements to work on the new railway ramp within the Camp 2 receiving area, which was ready by June 1942.

The first section of Treblinka II (Camp 1) was the Wohnlager administrative and residential compound; it had a telephone line. The main road within the camp was paved and named Seidel Straße (Note: The ß, called Eszett or scharfes s ("sharp s") in German, is roughly equivalent to ss.) after Unterscharführer Kurt Seidel, the SS corporal who supervised its construction. A few side roads were lined with gravel. The main gate for road traffic was erected on the north side. Barracks were built with supplies delivered from Warsaw, Sokołów Podlaski, and Kosów Lacki. There were a kitchen, a bakery, and dining rooms; all were equipped with high-quality items taken from Jewish ghettos. The Germans and Ukrainians each had their own sleeping quarters, positioned at an angle for better control of all entrances. There were also two barracks behind an inner fence for the Jewish work commandos, known as Sonderkommandos. SS-Untersturmführer Kurt Franz set up a small zoo in the centre next to his horse stables, containing two foxes, two peacocks and a roe deer (introduced in 1943). Smaller rooms were built as laundry, tailors, and cobblers, and for woodworking and medical aid. Closest to the SS quarters were separate barracks for the Polish and Ukrainian women who served, cleaned, and worked in the kitchen.

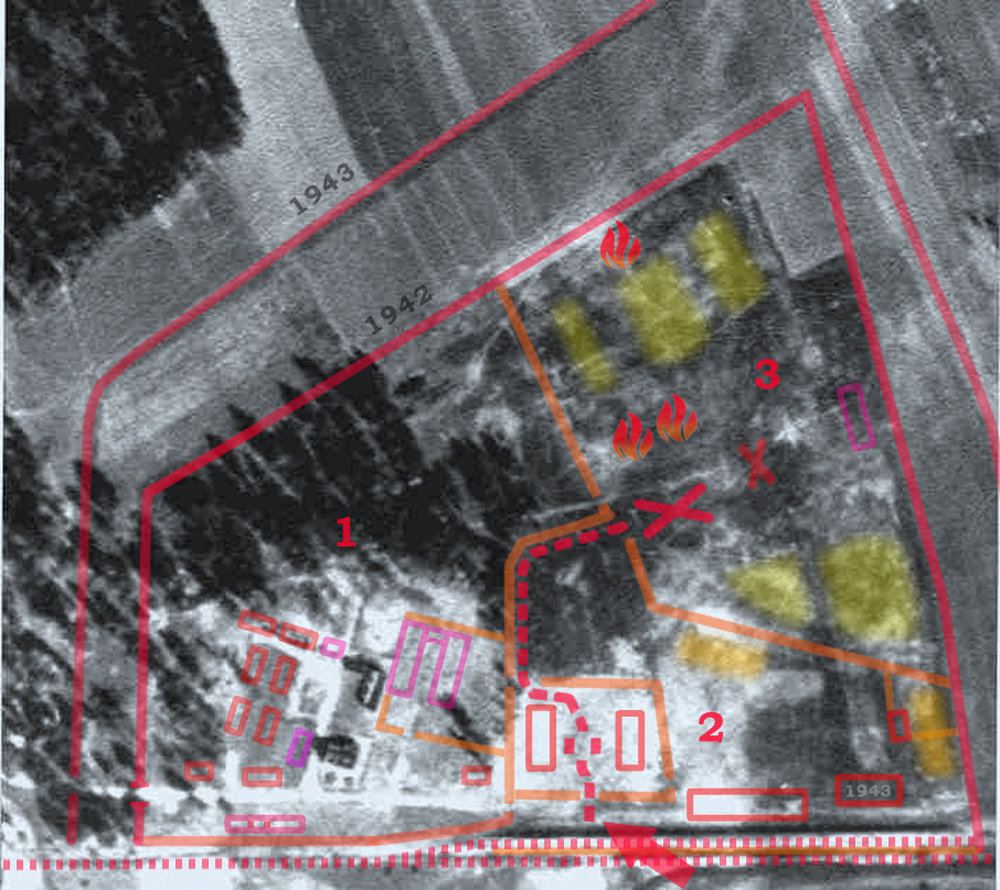
The 1944 aerial photo of Treblinka II after efforts at "clean-up", or disguising its role as a death camp. The new farmhouse and livestock building are visible to the lower left. The photograph is overlaid with outlines of already-dismantled structures (marked in red/orange). On the left are the SS and Hiwi (Trawniki) guards' living quarters (1), with barracks defined by the surrounding walkways. At the bottom (2) are the railway ramp and unloading platform (centre), marked with the red arrow. The "road to heaven" is marked with a dashed line. The undressing barracks for men and women, surrounded by a solid fence with no view of the outside, are marked with two rectangles. The location of the new, big gas chambers (3) is marked with a large X. The burial pits, dug with a crawler excavator, are marked in light yellow.

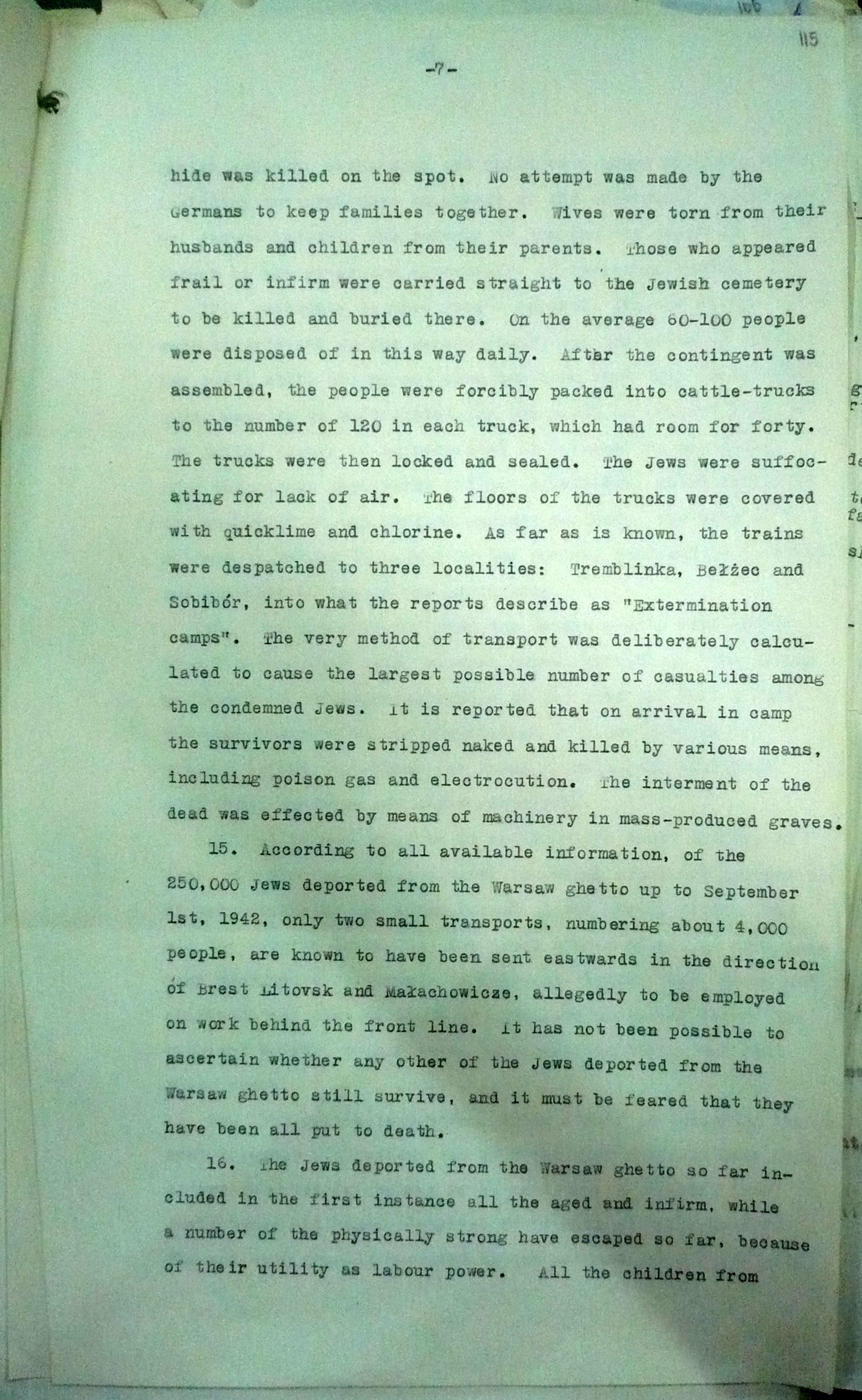
Page 7 from "Raczyński's Note" with Treblinka, Bełżec and Sobibór extermination camps identified- Part of the official note of the Polish government-in-exile to Anthony Eden, 10 December 1942.

The next section of Treblinka II (Camp 2, also called the lower camp or Auffanglager), was the receiving area where the railway unloading ramp extended from the Treblinka line into the camp. There was a long and narrow platform surrounded by barbed-wire fencing. A new building, erected on the platform, was disguised as a railway station complete with a wooden clock and fake rail terminal signs. SS-Scharführer Josef Hirtreiter, who worked on the unloading ramp was known for being especially cruel; he grabbed crying toddlers by their feet and smashed their heads against wagons. Behind a second fence, about 100 m (330 ft) from the track, there were two large barracks used for undressing, with a cashier's booth where money and jewelry were collected, ostensibly for safekeeping. Jews who resisted were taken away or beaten to death by the guards. The area where the women and children were shorn of their hair was on the other side of the path from the men. All buildings in the lower camp, including the barber barracks, contained the piled up clothing and belongings of the prisoners. Behind the station building, further to the right, there was a Sorting Square where all baggage was first collected by the Lumpenkommando. It was flanked by a fake infirmary called "Lazarett", with the Red Cross sign on it. It was a small barracks surrounded by barbed wire, where the sick, old, wounded and "difficult" prisoners were taken. Directly behind the "Lazarett" shack, there was an open excavation pit seven metres (23 ft) deep. These prisoners were led to the edge of the pit and shot one at a time by Blockführer Willi Mentz, nicknamed "Frankenstein" by the inmates. Mentz single-handedly killed thousands of Jews, aided by his supervisor, August Miete, who was called the "Angel of Death" by the prisoners. The pit was also used to burn old worn-out clothes and identity papers deposited by new arrivals at the undressing area.

The third section of Treblinka II (Camp 3, also called the upper camp) was the main killing zone, with gas chambers at its centre. It was completely screened from the railway tracks by an earth bank built with the help of a mechanical digger. This mound was elongated in shape, similar to a retaining wall, and can be seen in a sketch produced during the 1970 trial of Treblinka II commandant Franz Stangl. On the other sides, the zone was camouflaged from new arrivals like the rest of the camp, using tree branches woven into barbed wire fences by the Tarnungskommando (the work detail led out to collect them). From the undressing barracks, a fenced-off path led through the forested area to the gas chambers. The SS cynically called it die Himmelstraße ("the road to heaven") or der Schlauch ("the tube"). For the first eight months of the camp's operation, the excavator was used to dig burial ditches on both sides of the gas chambers; these ditches were 50 m (160 ft) long, 25 m (82 ft) wide, and 10 m (33 ft) deep. In early 1943, they were replaced with cremation pyres up to 30 m (98 ft) long, with rails laid across the pits on concrete blocks. The 300 prisoners who operated the upper camp lived in separate barracks behind the gas chambers.

== Killing process ==
Unlike Nazi concentration camps in which prisoners were used as forced labour, extermination camps such as Treblinka had only one function: to murder those sent there. To prevent incoming victims from realising its nature, Treblinka II was disguised as a transit camp for deportations further east, complete with fake train schedules, a fake train-station clock with hands painted on it, names of destinations, a fake ticket window, and the sign "Ober Majdan", a code word for Treblinka commonly used to deceive prisoners arriving from Western Europe. Majdan was a prewar landed estate 5 km (3.1 mi) away from the camp.

=== Polish Jews ===
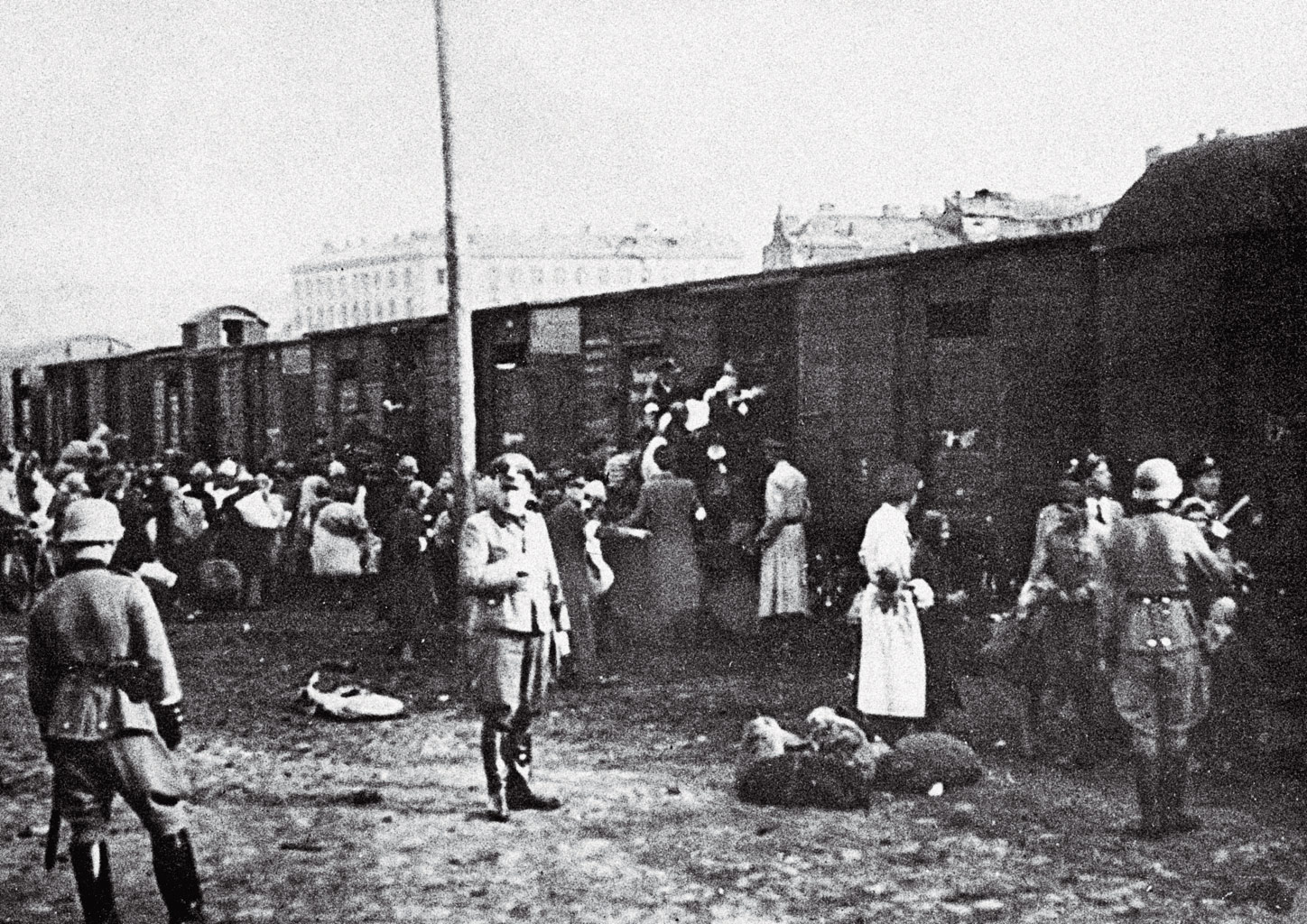
Jews being loaded onto trains to Treblinka at the Warsaw Ghetto's Umschlagplatz, 1942

The mass deportation of Jews from the Warsaw Ghetto began on 22 July 1942 with the first transportation of 6,000 people. The gas chambers began to be operated the following morning. For the next two months, deportations from Warsaw continued daily, via two shuttle trains (the second one, from 6 August 1942), each carrying about 4,000 to 7,000 people crying for water. No other trains were allowed to stop at the Treblinka station. The first daily trains came in the early morning, often after an overnight wait, and the second, in mid-afternoon. All new arrivals were sent immediately to the undressing area by the Bahnhofskommando squad that managed the arrival platform, and from there to the gas chambers. According to German records, including the official report by SS-Brigadeführer Jürgen Stroop, 265,000 Jews were transported in freight trains from the Warsaw Ghetto to Treblinka during the period from 22 July to 12 September 1942.

The Polish railway was very heavily used. An average of 420 German military trains were passing through every 24 hours on top of internal traffic already in 1941. The Holocaust trains' passage to their destination was routinely delayed; some transports took many days to arrive. Hundreds of prisoners were murdered by exhaustion, suffocation and thirst while in transit to the camp in the overcrowded wagons. In extreme cases, such as the Biała Podlaska transport of 6,000 Jews travelling only a 125 km (78 mi) distance, up to 90 percent of people were already dead when the sealed doors were opened. From September 1942 on, both Polish and foreign Jews were greeted with a brief verbal announcement. An earlier signboard with directions was removed because it was clearly insufficient. The deportees were told that they had arrived at a transit point on the way to Ukraine and needed to shower and have their clothes disinfected before receiving work uniforms and new orders.

=== Foreign Jews and Romani people ===
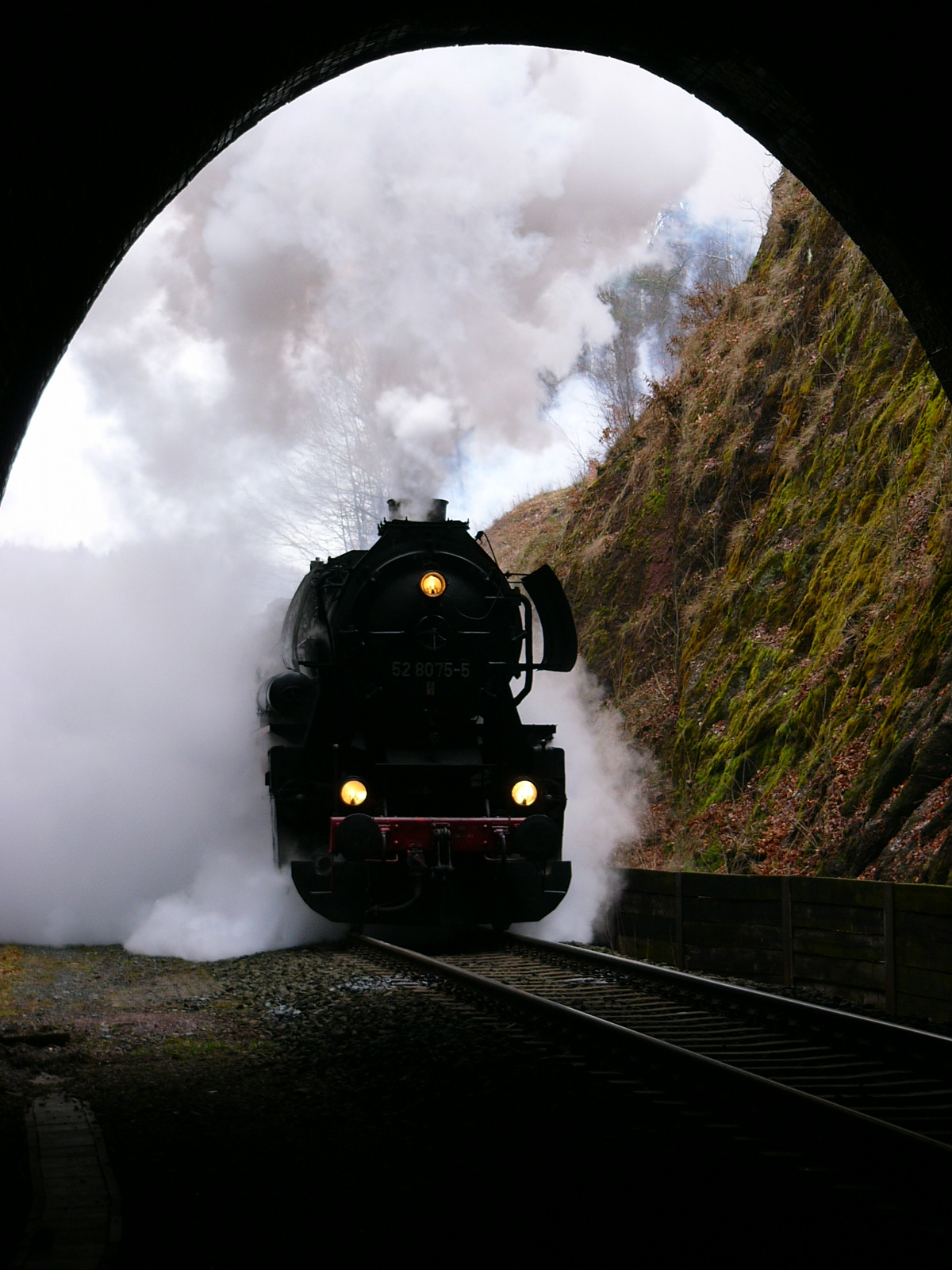
Standard Holocaust locomotive, DRB Class 52

Treblinka received transports of almost 20,000 foreign Jews between October 1942 and March 1943, including 8,000 from the German Protectorate of Bohemia and Moravia via Theresienstadt, and over 11,000 from Bulgarian-occupied Thrace, Macedonia, and Pirot following an agreement with the Nazi-allied Bulgarian government. They had train tickets and arrived predominantly in passenger carriages with considerable luggage, travel foods and drinks, all of which were taken by the SS to the food storage barracks. The provisions included such items as smoked mutton, speciality breads, wine, cheese, fruit, tea, coffee, and sweets. Unlike Polish Jews arriving in Holocaust trains from nearby ghettos in cities like Warsaw, Radom, and those of Bezirk Bialystok, the foreign Jews received a warm welcome upon arrival from an SS man (either Otto Stadie or Willy Mätzig), after which they were murdered like the others. Treblinka was mainly used for the murder of Polish Jews, Bełżec was used to murder Jews from Austria and the Sudetenland, and Sobibór was used to murder Jews from France and the Netherlands. Auschwitz-Birkenau was used to murder Jews from almost every other country in Europe. The frequency of arriving transports slowed down in winter.

The decoupled locomotive went back to the Treblinka station or to the layover yard in Małkinia for the next load, while the victims were pulled from the carriages onto the platform by Kommando Blau, one of the Jewish work details forced to assist the Germans at the camp. They were led through the gate amidst chaos and screaming. They were separated by gender behind the gate; women were pushed into the undressing barracks and barber on the left, and men were sent to the right. All were ordered to tie their shoes together and strip. Some kept their own towels. The Jews who resisted were taken to the "Lazarett", also called the "Red Cross infirmary", and shot behind it. Women had their hair cut off; therefore, it took longer to prepare them for the gas chambers than men. The hair was used in the manufacture of socks for U-boat crews and hair-felt footwear for the Deutsche Reichsbahn. (Note: The Deutsche Reichsbahn, (German Reich Railway or German Imperial Railway,) was the German national railway created from the railways of the individual states of the German Empire following the end of World War I.)

Most of those murdered at Treblinka were Jews, but about 2,000 Romani people were also murdered there. Like the Jews, the Romani were first rounded up and sent to the ghettos. At a conference on 30 January 1940 it was decided that all 30,000 Romani living in Germany proper were to be deported to former Polish territory. Most of these were sent to Jewish ghettos in the General Government, such as those in Warsaw and Łódź. As with the Jews, most Romani who went to Treblinka were murdered in the gas chambers, although some were shot. The majority of the Jews living in ghettos were sent to Bełżec, Sobibór, or Treblinka to be murdered; most of the Romani living in the ghettos were shot on the spot. There were no known Romani escapees or survivors from Treblinka.

=== Gas chambers ===
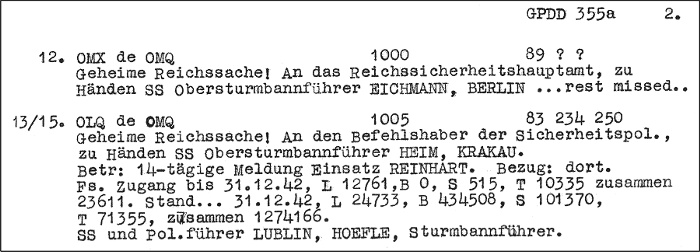
The Höfle telegram, a decoded telegram to Berlin from the deputy commander of Aktion Reinhard, Hermann Höfle, 15 January 1943, listing the number of arrivals in Aktion Reinhard extermination camps. In this document, the 1942 total for Treblinka of 71355 is considered to be a transcription error for 713,555, which would yield a total of 1,274,166, matching the total in the telegram.

After undressing, newly arrived Jews were beaten with whips to drive them towards the gas chambers; hesitant men were treated particularly brutally. Rudolf Höss, the commandant at Auschwitz, contrasted the practice at Treblinka of deceiving the victims about the showers with his own camp's practice of telling them they had to go through a "delousing" process. According to the postwar testimony of some SS officers, men were always gassed first, while women and children waited outside the gas chambers for their turn. During this time, the women and children could hear the sounds of suffering from inside the chambers, and they became aware of what awaited them, which caused panic, distress, and even involuntary defecation.

The gas chambers were completely enclosed by a high wooden fence. Originally, they consisted of three interconnected barracks 8 m (26 ft) long and 4 m (13 ft) wide, disguised as showers. They had double walls insulated by earth packed down in between. The interior walls and ceilings were lined with roofing paper. The floors were covered with tin-plated sheet metal, the same material used for the roof. Solid wooden doors were insulated with rubber and bolted from the outside by heavy cross-bars.

According to Stangl, a train transport of about 3,000 people could be "processed" in three hours. In a 14-hour workday, 12,000 to 15,000 people were murdered. After the new gas chambers were built, the duration of the killing process was reduced to an hour and a half. The victims were murdered via gas, using the exhaust fumes conducted through pipes from an engine of a Red Army tank. (Note: Witnesses who had closer experiences to the actual gassing engine share a large agreement that they were run by gasoline/petrol, while those witnesses with only an indirect hearsay knowledge of the engine were more likely to identify it as diesel. More recent research in newly-opened archives has shown that gasoline engines, and not diesel engines, were used in Treblinka, Belzec and Sobibor. Direct eyewitness evidence supports this conclusion. It is a simple matter of new information becoming available. Water pipes that conducted the poisonous gas to the shower heads ran along the ceiling creating the illusion of a shower as in the simulated shower rooms. In Sobibor and Treblinka they applied the same system to produce carbon monoxide using heavy gasoline engines.) SS-Scharführer Erich Fuchs was responsible for installing it. The engine was brought in by the SS at the time of the camp's construction and housed in a room with a generator that supplied the camp with electricity. The tank engine exhaust pipe ran just below the ground and opened into all three gas chambers. The fumes could be seen seeping out. After about 20 minutes the bodies were removed by dozens of Sonderkommandos, placed onto carts and wheeled away. The system was imperfect and required a lot of effort; trains that arrived later in the day had to wait on layover tracks overnight at Treblinka, Małkinia, or Wólka Okrąglik.

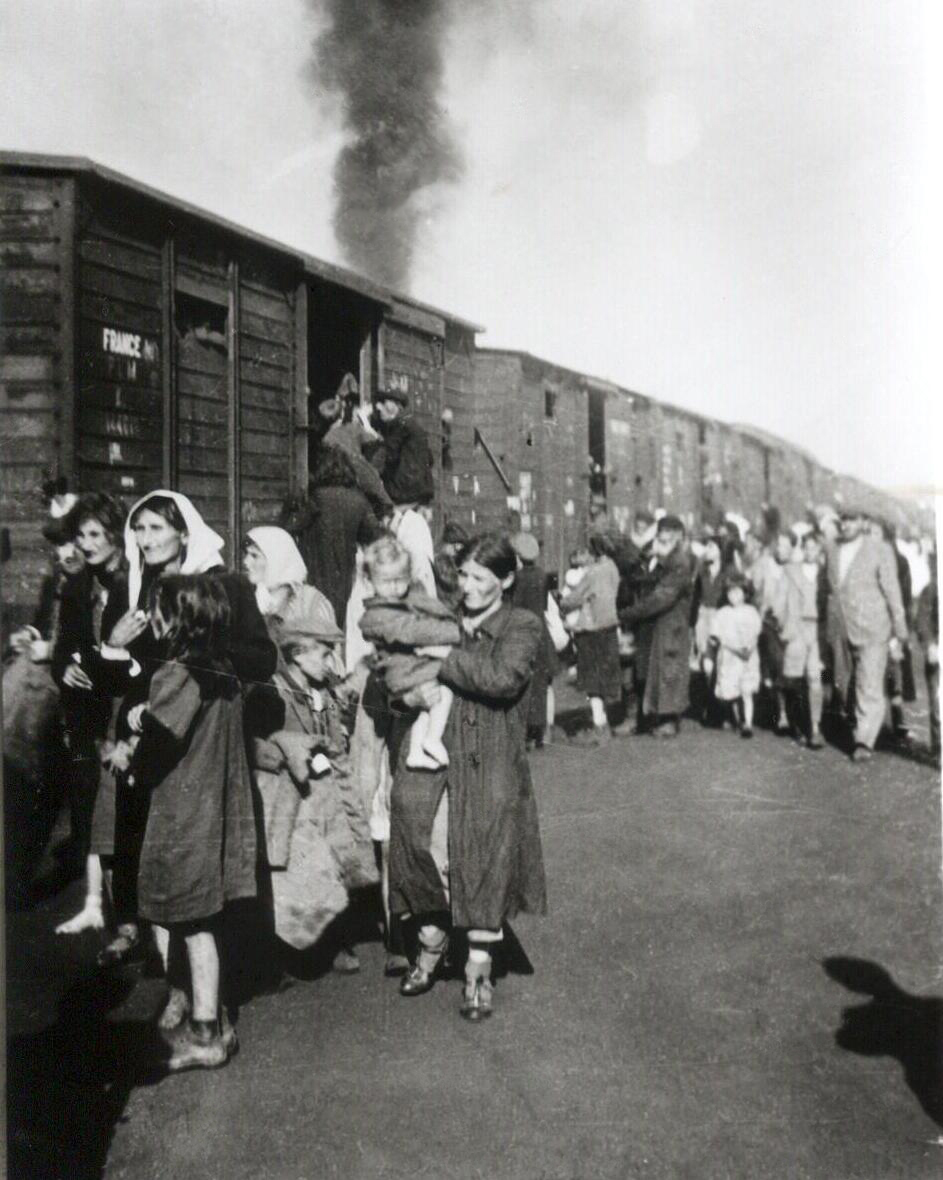
Deportation of 10,000 Polish Jews to Treblinka during the liquidation of the ghetto in Siedlce beginning 23 August 1942

Between August and September 1942, a large new building with a concrete foundation was built from bricks and mortar under the guidance of Erwin Lambert, who had supervised the construction of gas chambers for the Action T4 involuntary euthanasia program. It contained 8–10 gas chambers, each of which was 8 by 4 m (26 by 13 ft), and it had a corridor in the centre. Stangl supervised its construction and brought in building materials from the nearby village of Małkinia by dismantling factory stock. During this time victims continued to arrive daily and were led naked past the building site to the original gas chambers. The new gas chambers became operational after five weeks of construction, equipped with two fume-producing engines instead of one. The metal doors, which had been taken from Soviet military bunkers around Białystok, had portholes through which it was possible to observe the dead before removing them. Stangl said that the old gas chambers were capable of murdering 3,000 people in three hours. The new ones had the highest possible capacity of any gas chambers in the three Reinhard death camps and could murder up to 22,000 or 25,000 people every day, a fact which Globocnik once boasted about to Kurt Gerstein, a fellow SS officer from Disinfection Services. The new gas chambers were seldom used to their full capacity; 12,000–15,000 victims remained the daily average.

The killing process at Treblinka differed significantly from the method used at Auschwitz and Majdanek, where the poison gas Zyklon B (hydrogen cyanide) was used. At Treblinka, Sobibór, and Bełżec, the victims were murdered by suffocation and carbon monoxide poisoning from engine exhaust in stationary gas chambers. At Chełmno, they were carried within two specially equipped and engineered trucks, driven at a scientifically calculated speed so as to murder the Jews inside it during the trip, rather than force the drivers and guards to murder them at the destination. After visiting Treblinka on a guided tour, Auschwitz commandant Rudolf Höss concluded that using exhaust gas was inferior to the cyanide used at his extermination camp. The chambers became silent after 12 minutes and were closed for 20 minutes or less. According to Jankiel Wiernik, who survived the 1943 prisoner uprising and escaped, when the doors of the gas chambers had been opened, the bodies of the victims were standing and kneeling rather than lying down, due to the severe overcrowding. Dead mothers embraced the bodies of their children. Prisoners who worked in the Sonderkommandos later testified that the dead frequently let out a last gasp of air when they were extracted from the chambers. Some victims showed signs of life during the disposal of the corpses, but the guards routinely refused to react.

=== Cremation pits ===
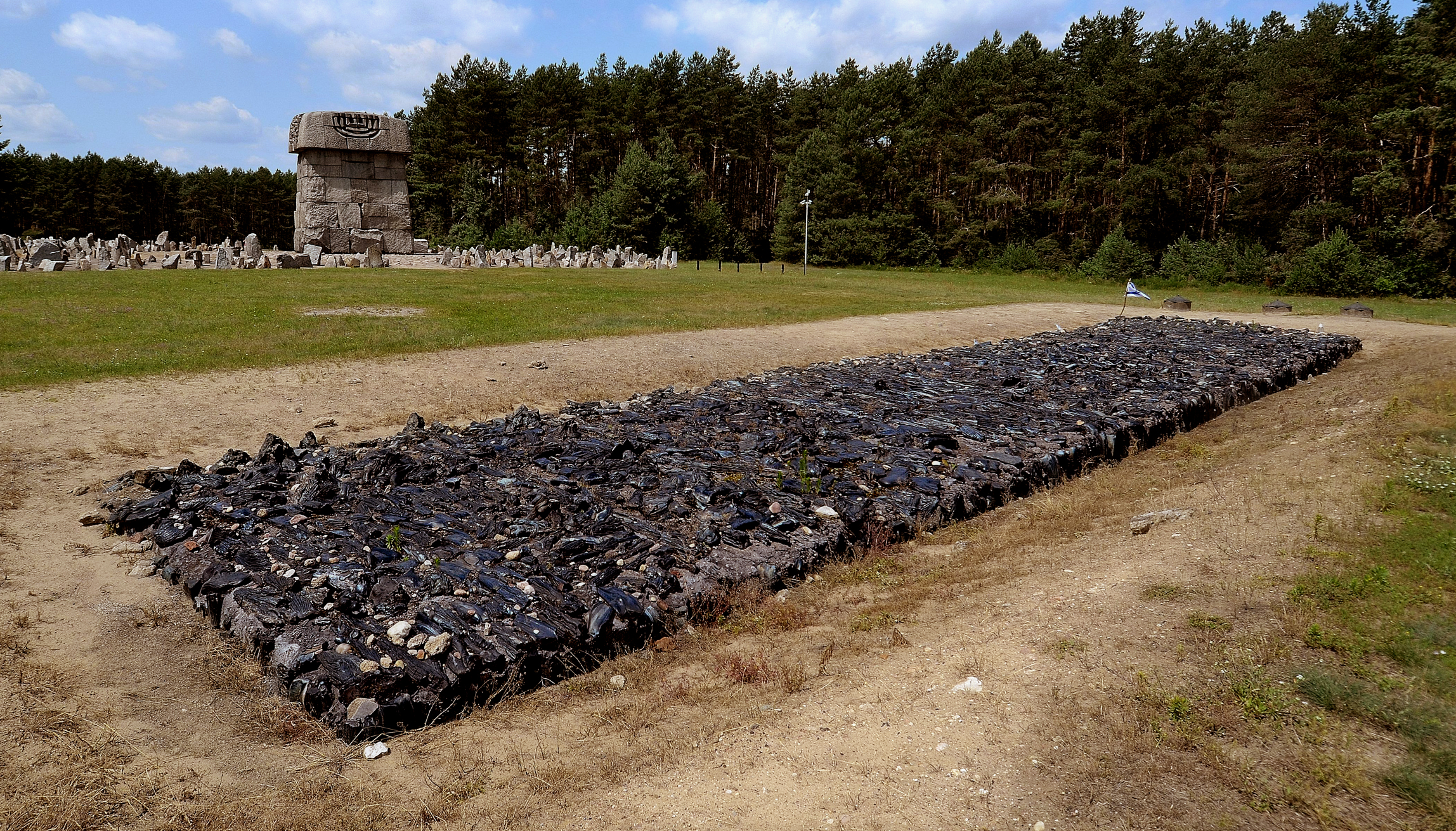
Stone memorial resembling one of the original cremation pits where the bodies were burned. It is a flat grave marker constructed of crushed and cemented black basalt symbolising burnt charcoal. Following cremation, the ashes were mixed with sand and spread over an area of 2.2 ha (5.4 acres).

The Germans became aware of the political danger associated with the mass burial of corpses in April 1943 after they discovered the graves of Polish victims of the 1940 Katyn massacre carried out by the Soviets near Smolensk. The bodies of the 10,000 Polish officers executed by the NKVD were well preserved despite their long burial. The Germans formed the Katyn Commission to prove that the Soviets were solely responsible, and used radio broadcast and newsfilm to alert the Allies to this war crime. Subsequently, the Nazi leadership, concerned about covering up their own crimes, issued the secret orders to exhume the corpses buried at death camps and burn them. The cremations began shortly after Himmler's visit to the camp in late February or early March 1943.

To incinerate bodies, large cremation pits were constructed at Camp 3 within Treblinka II. (Note: according to court judgement of the 1st Treblinka trial in Düsseldorf, in the case main proceedings the number of cremation pyres could not be established exactly.) The burning pyres were used to cremate the new corpses along with the old ones, which had to be dug up as they had been buried during the first six months of the camp's operation. Built under the instructions of Herbert Floß, the camp's cremation expert, the pits consisted of railroad rails laid as grates on blocks of concrete. The bodies were placed on rails over wood, splashed with petrol, and burned. It was a harrowing sight, according to Jankiel Wiernik, with the bellies of pregnant women exploding from boiling amniotic fluid. He wrote that "the heat radiating from the pits was maddening." The bodies burned for five hours, without the ashing of bones. The pyres operated 24 hours a day. Once the system had been perfected, 10,000–12,000 bodies at a time could be incinerated.

The open air burn pits were located east of the new gas chambers and refuelled from 4 a.m. (or after 5 a.m. depending on work-load) to 6 p.m. in roughly 5-hour intervals. The current camp memorial includes a flat grave marker resembling one of them. It is constructed from melted basalt and has a concrete foundation. It is a symbolic grave, as the Nazis spread the actual human ashes, mixed with sand, over an area of 2.2 ha (5.4 acres).

== Organization of the camp ==
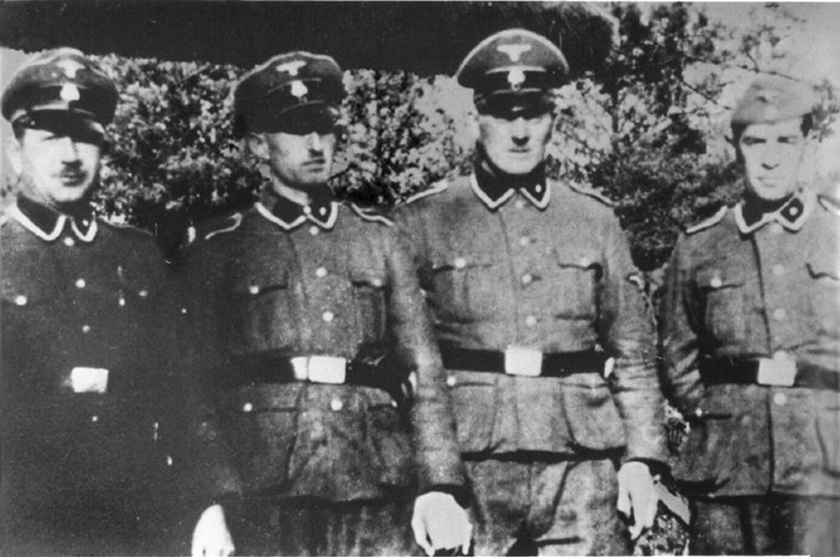
Members of SS-Totenkopfverbände from Treblinka (from left): Paul Bredow, Willi Mentz, Max Möller and Josef Hirtreiter

The camp was operated by 20–25 German and Austrian members of the SS-Totenkopfverbände and 80–120 Wachmänner ("watchmen") guards who had been trained at a special SS facility in the Trawniki concentration camp near Lublin, Poland; all Wachmänner guards were trained at Trawniki. The guards were mainly ethnic German Volksdeutsche from the east and Ukrainians, with some Russians, Tatars, Moldovans, Latvians, and Central Asians, all of whom had served in the Red Army. They were enlisted by Karl Streibel, the commander of the Trawniki camp, from the prisoner of war (POW) camps for Soviet soldiers. (Note: See list of known Hiwi guards with relevant commentary.) The degree to which their recruitment was voluntary remains disputed; while conditions in the camps for Soviet POWs were dreadful, some Soviet POWs collaborated with the Germans even before cold, hunger, and disease began devastating the POW camps in mid-September 1941.

The work at Treblinka was carried out under threat of death by Jewish prisoners organised into specialised work details. At the Camp 2 Auffanglager receiving area each squad had a different coloured triangle. The triangles made it impossible for new arrivals to try to blend in with members of the work details. The blue unit (Kommando Blau) managed the rail ramp and unlocked the freight wagons. They met the new arrivals, carried out people who had died en route, removed bundles, and cleaned the wagon floors. The red unit (Kommando Rot), which was the largest squad, unpacked and sorted the belongings of victims after they had been "processed". (Note: The term durchgeschleust or "processed" to describe the annihilation of Jews in the occupied Eastern territories appeared in the Korherr Report, at the request of Heinrich Himmler, who had objected to the word Sonderbehandlung or "special treatment" being used for death since 1939 (following Heydrich's 20 September 1939 telegram to the Gestapo).) The red unit delivered these belongings to the storage barracks, which were managed by the yellow unit (Kommando Gelb), who separated the items by quality, removed the Star of David from all outer garments, and extracted any money sewn into the linings. The yellow unit was followed by the Desinfektionskommando, who disinfected the belongings, including sacks of hair from women who had been murdered there. The Goldjuden unit ("gold Jews") collected and counted banknotes and evaluated the gold and jewellery.

A different group of about 300 men, called the Totenjuden ("Jews for the dead"), lived and worked in Camp 3 across from the gas chambers. For the first six months they took the corpses away for burial after gold teeth had been extracted. Once cremation began in early 1943 they took the corpses to the pits, refuelled the pyres, crushed the remaining bones with mallets, and collected the ashes for disposal. Each trainload of "deportees" brought to Treblinka consisted of an average of sixty heavily guarded wagons. They were divided into three sets of twenty at the layover yard. Each set was processed within the first two hours of backing onto the ramp, and was then made ready by the Sonderkommandos to be exchanged for the next set of twenty wagons.

Members of all work units were continuously beaten by the guards and often shot. Replacements were selected from the new arrivals. There were other work details which had no contact with the transports: the Holzfällerkommando ("woodcutter unit") cut and chopped firewood, and the Tarnungskommando ("disguise unit") camouflaged the structures of the camp. Another work detail was responsible for cleaning the common areas. The Camp 1 Wohnlager residential compound contained barracks for about 700 Sonderkommandos which, when combined with the 300 Totenjuden living across from the gas chambers, brought their grand total to roughly one thousand at a time.

Many Sonderkommando prisoners hanged themselves at night. Suicides in the Totenjuden barracks occurred at the rate of 15 to 20 per day. The work crews were almost entirely replaced every few days; members of the old work detail were murdered except for the most resilient.

== Treblinka prisoner uprising ==
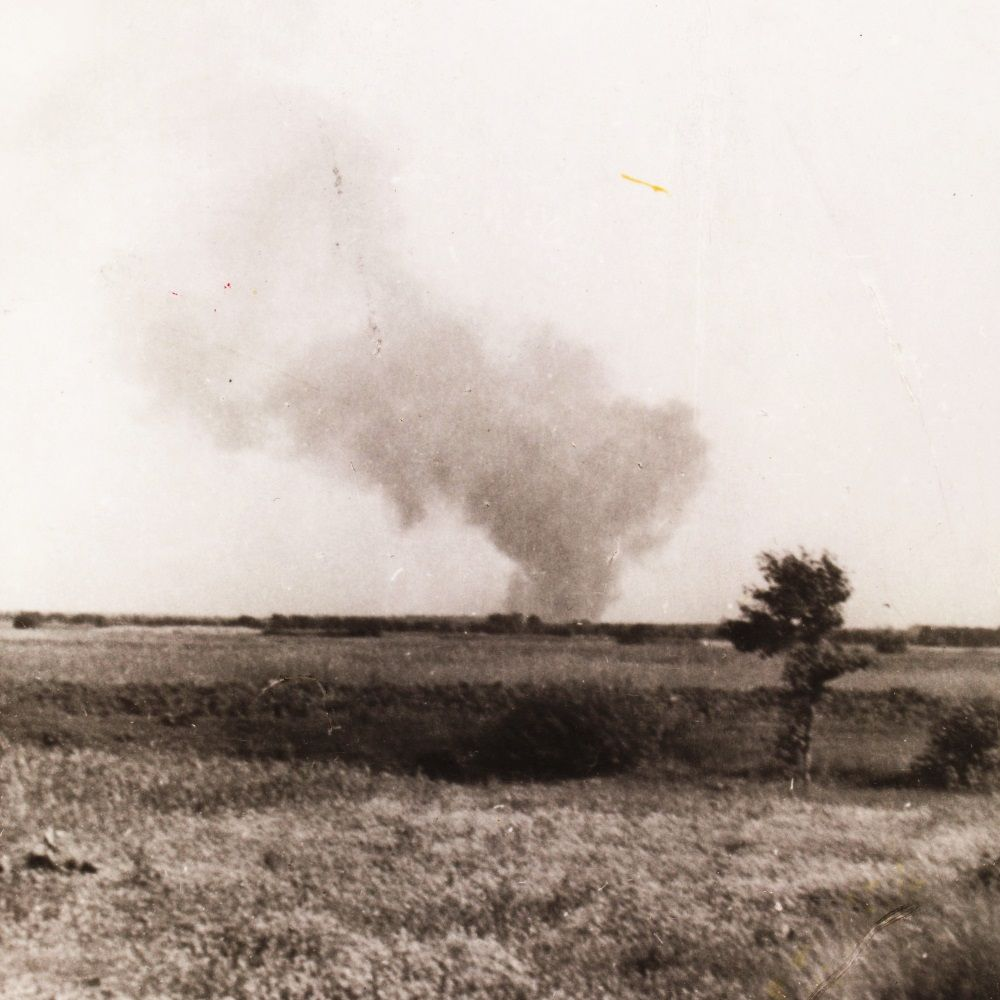
Burning Treblinka II perimeter during the prisoner uprising, 2 August 1943. Barracks were set ablaze, including a tank of petrol which exploded setting fire to the surrounding structures. This clandestine photograph was taken by Franciszek Ząbecki.

In early 1943, an underground Jewish resistance organisation was formed at Treblinka with the goal of seizing control of the camp and escaping to freedom. The planned revolt was preceded by a long period of secret preparations. The clandestine unit was first organised by a former Jewish captain of the Polish Army, Dr. Julian Chorążycki, who was described by fellow plotter Samuel Rajzman as noble and essential to the action. His organising committee included Zelomir Bloch (leadership), Rudolf Masaryk, Marceli Galewski, Samuel Rajzman, Dr. Irena Lewkowska ("Irka", from the sick bay for the Hiwis), Leon Haberman, Chaim Sztajer, Hershl (Henry) Sperling from Częstochowa, and several others. Chorążycki (who treated the German patients) killed himself with poison on 19 April 1943 when faced with imminent capture, so that the Germans could not discover the plot by torturing him. The next leader was another former Polish Army officer, Dr. Berek Lajcher, (Note: He was remembered by survivors as either "Dr Lecher", or "Dr Leichert".) who arrived on 1 May. Born in Częstochowa, he had practised medicine in Wyszków and was expelled by the Nazis to Wegrów in 1939.

The date of the revolt was initially set for 15 June 1943, but it had to be postponed. A fighter smuggled a grenade in one of the early May trains carrying captured rebels from the Warsaw Ghetto Uprising, which had begun on 19 April 1943. When he detonated it in the undressing area, the SS and guards were thrown into a panic. After the explosion, Treblinka received only about 7,000 Jews from the capital for fear of similar incidents; the remaining 42,000 Warsaw Jews were deported to Majdanek instead. The burning of unearthed corpses continued at full speed until the end of July. The Treblinka II conspirators became increasingly concerned about their future as the amount of work for them began to decline. With fewer transports arriving, they realised "they were next in line for the gas chambers."

=== Day of the revolt and survivors ===
The uprising was launched on the hot summer day of 2 August 1943 (Monday, a regular day of rest from gassing), when a group of Germans and 40 Ukrainians drove off to the River Bug to swim. The conspirators silently unlocked the door to the arsenal near the train tracks, with a key that had been duplicated earlier. They had stolen 20–25 rifles, 20 hand grenades, and several pistols, and delivered them in a cart to the gravel work detail. At 3:45 p.m., 700 Jews launched an insurgency that lasted for 30 minutes. They set buildings ablaze, exploded a tank of petrol, and set fire to the surrounding structures. A group of armed Jews attacked the main gate, and others attempted to climb the fence. Machine-gun fire from about 25 Germans and 60 Ukrainian Trawnikis resulted in near-total slaughter. Lajcher was killed along with most of the insurgents. About 200 Jews escaped from the camp. (Note: Two hundred is the number accepted by Polish historians and the Treblinka camp museum; the Holocaust Encyclopedia lists 300, instead.) Half of them were killed after a chase in cars and on horses. The Jews did not cut the phone wires, and Stangl called in hundreds of German reinforcements, who arrived from four towns and set up roadblocks along the way. Partisans of the Armia Krajowa (Polish: Home Army) transported some of the surviving escapees across the river and others like Sperling ran 30 km (19 mi) and were then helped and fed by Polish villagers. Of those who broke through, around 70 are known to have survived until the end of the war, including the future authors of published Treblinka memoirs: Richard Glazar, Chil Rajchman, Jankiel Wiernik, and Samuel Willenberg.

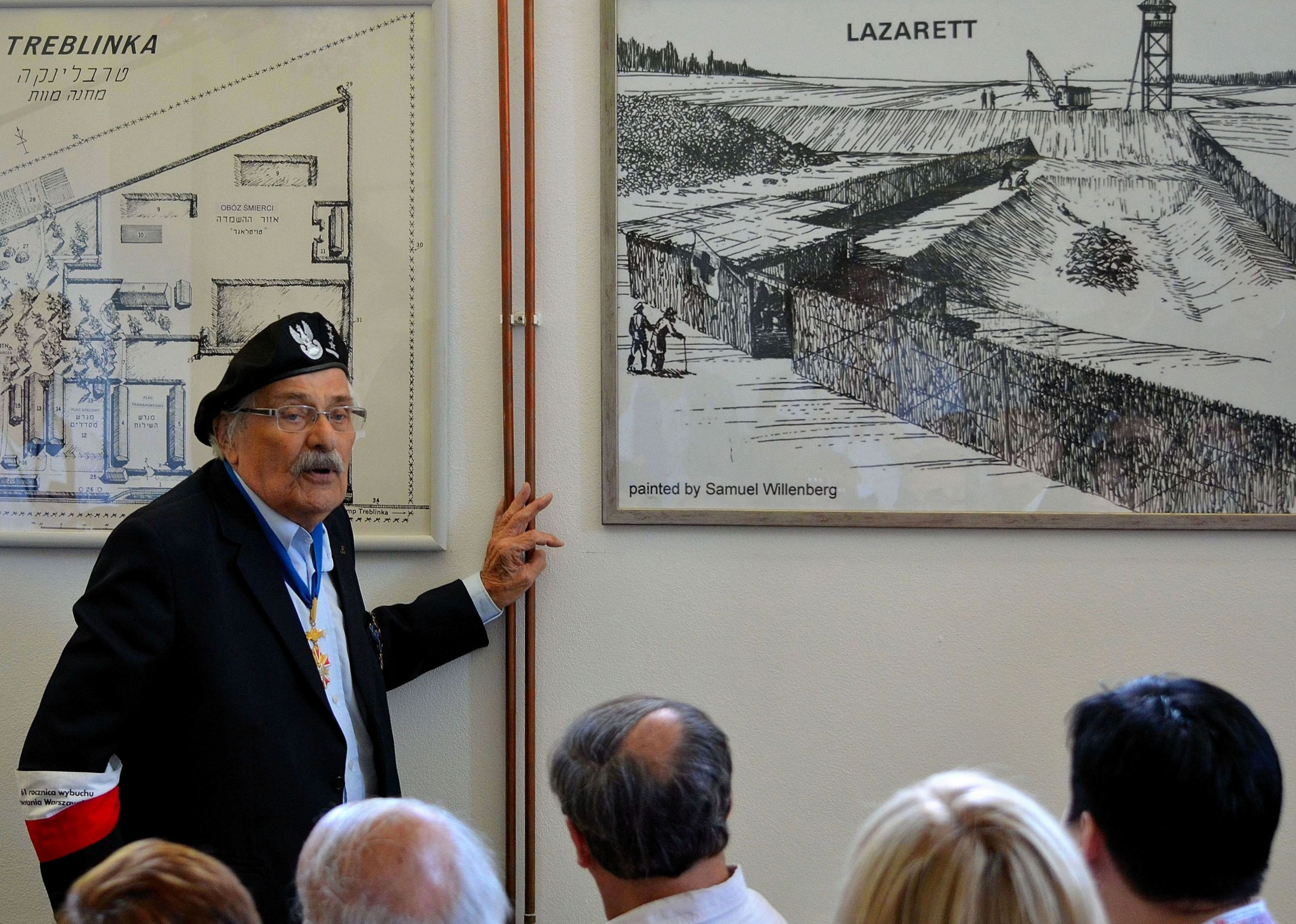
Survivor Samuel Willenberg presenting his drawings of Treblinka II in the Museum of Struggle and Martyrdom at the site of the camp. On the right, the "Lazarett" killing station.

Among the Jewish prisoners who escaped after setting fire to the camp, there were two 19-year-olds, Samuel Willenberg and Kalman Taigman, who had both arrived in 1942 and had been forced to work there under the threat of death. Taigman died in 2012 (Note: With Taigman's death c. 27 July 2012, and Willenberg became the last survivor.) and Willenberg in 2016. Taigman stated of his experience, "It was hell, absolutely hell. A normal man cannot imagine how a living person could have lived through it – killers, natural-born killers, who without a trace of remorse just murdered every little thing." Willenberg and Taigman emigrated to Israel after the war and devoted their last years to retelling the story of Treblinka. (Note: There was also a revolt at Sobibór two months later, and at Auschwitz-Birkenau on 7 October 1944.) Escapees Hershl Sperling and Richard Glazar both suffered from survivor guilt syndrome and eventually killed themselves. Chaim Sztajer, who was 34 at the time of the uprising, had survived 11 months as a Sonderkommando in Treblinka II and was instrumental in the coordination of the uprising between the two camps. Following his escape in the uprising, Sztajer survived for over a year in the forest before the liberation of Poland. Following the war, he migrated to Israel and then to Melbourne, Australia where later in life he constructed from memory a model of Treblinka which is currently displayed at the Jewish Holocaust Centre in Melbourne.

=== After the uprising ===
After the revolt, Stangl met the head of Operation Reinhard, Odilo Globocnik, and inspector Christian Wirth in Lublin, and decided not to draft a report, as no native Germans had died putting down the revolt. Stangl wanted to rebuild the camp, but Globocnik told him it would be closed down shortly and Stangl would be transferred to Trieste to help fight the partisans there. The Nazi high command may have felt that Stangl, Globocnik, Wirth, and other Reinhard personnel knew too much and wanted to dispose of them by sending them to the front. With almost all the Jews from the German ghettos (established in Poland) murdered, there would have been little point in rebuilding the facility. Auschwitz had enough capacity to fulfil the Nazis' remaining extermination needs, rendering Treblinka redundant.

The camp's new commandant Kurt Franz, formerly its deputy commandant, took over in August. After the war he testified that gassings had stopped by then. In reality, despite the extensive damage to the camp, the gas chambers were intact, and the murder of Polish Jews continued. Speed was reduced, with only ten wagons rolled onto the ramp at a time, while the others had to wait. The last two rail transports of Jews were brought to the camp for gassing from the Białystok Ghetto on 18 and 19 August 1943. They consisted of 76 wagons (37 the first day and 39 the second), according to a communiqué published by the Office of Information of the Armia Krajowa, based on observation of Holocaust trains passing through the village of Treblinka. The 39 wagons that came to Treblinka on 19 August 1943 were carrying at least 7,600 survivors of the Białystok Ghetto Uprising.

On 19 October 1943, Operation Reinhard was terminated by a letter from Odilo Globocnik. The following day, a large group of Jewish Arbeitskommandos who had worked on dismantling the camp structures over the previous few weeks were loaded onto the train and transported, via Siedlce and Chełm, to Sobibór to be gassed on 20 October 1943. Franz followed Globocnik and Stangl to Trieste in November. Clean-up operations continued over the winter. As part of these operations, Jews from the surviving work detail dismantled the gas chambers brick-by-brick and used them to erect a farmhouse on the site of the camp's former bakery. Globocnik confirmed its purpose as a secret guard post for a Nazi-Ukrainian agent to remain behind the scenes, in a letter he sent to Himmler from Trieste on 5 January 1944. A Hiwi guard called Oswald Strebel, a Ukrainian Volksdeutscher (ethnic German), was given permission to bring his family from Ukraine for "reasons of surveillance", wrote Globocnik; Strebel had worked as a guard at Treblinka II. He was instructed to tell visitors that he had been farming there for decades, but the local Poles were well aware of the existence of the camp.

== Operational command of Treblinka II ==
=== Irmfried Eberl ===
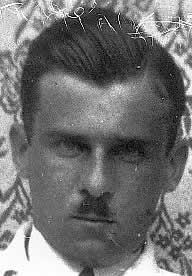
Irmfried Eberl, the first commandant of Treblinka II, removed because of his alleged incompetence in running the camp

SS-Obersturmführer Irmfried Eberl was appointed the camp's first commandant on 11 July 1942. He was a psychiatrist from Bernburg killing centre and the only physician-in-chief to command an extermination camp during World War II. According to some, his poor organisational skills caused the operation of Treblinka to turn disastrous; others point out that the number of transports that were coming in reflected the Nazi high command's wildly unrealistic expectations of Treblinka's ability to "process" these prisoners. The early gassing machinery frequently broke down due to overuse, forcing the SS to shoot Jews assembled for suffocation. The workers did not have enough time to bury them, and the mass graves were overflowing. According to the testimony of his colleague Unterscharführer Hans Hingst, Eberl's ego and thirst for power exceeded his ability: "So many transports arrived that the disembarkation and gassing of the people could no longer be handled." On incoming Holocaust trains to Treblinka, many of the Jews locked inside correctly guessed what was going to happen to them. The odour of decaying corpses could be smelled up to 10 km (6.2 mi) away.

Oskar Berger, a Jewish eyewitness, one of about 100 people who escaped during the 1943 uprising, told of the camp's state when he arrived there in August 1942:

When we were unloaded, we noticed a paralysing view – all over the place there were hundreds of human bodies. Piles of packages, clothes, suitcases, everything in a mess. German and Ukrainian SS-men stood at the corners of the barracks and were shooting blindly into the crowd.

When Globocnik made a surprise visit to Treblinka on 26 August 1942 with Christian Wirth and Wirth's adjutant from Bełżec, Josef Oberhauser, Eberl was dismissed on the spot. Among the reasons for dismissal were: incompetently disposing of the tens of thousands of dead bodies, using inefficient methods of murder, and not properly concealing the mass-murder. Eberl was transferred to Berlin, closer to operational headquarters in Hitler's Chancellery, where the main architect of the Holocaust, Heinrich Himmler, had just stepped up the pace of the programme. Globocnik assigned Wirth to remain in Treblinka temporarily to help clean up the camp. On 28 August 1942, Globocnik suspended deportations. He chose Franz Stangl, who had been the commandant of the Sobibór extermination camp, to assume command of the camp as Eberl's successor. Stangl had a reputation as a competent administrator with a good understanding of the project's objectives, and Globocnik trusted that he would be capable of resuming control.

=== Franz Stangl ===
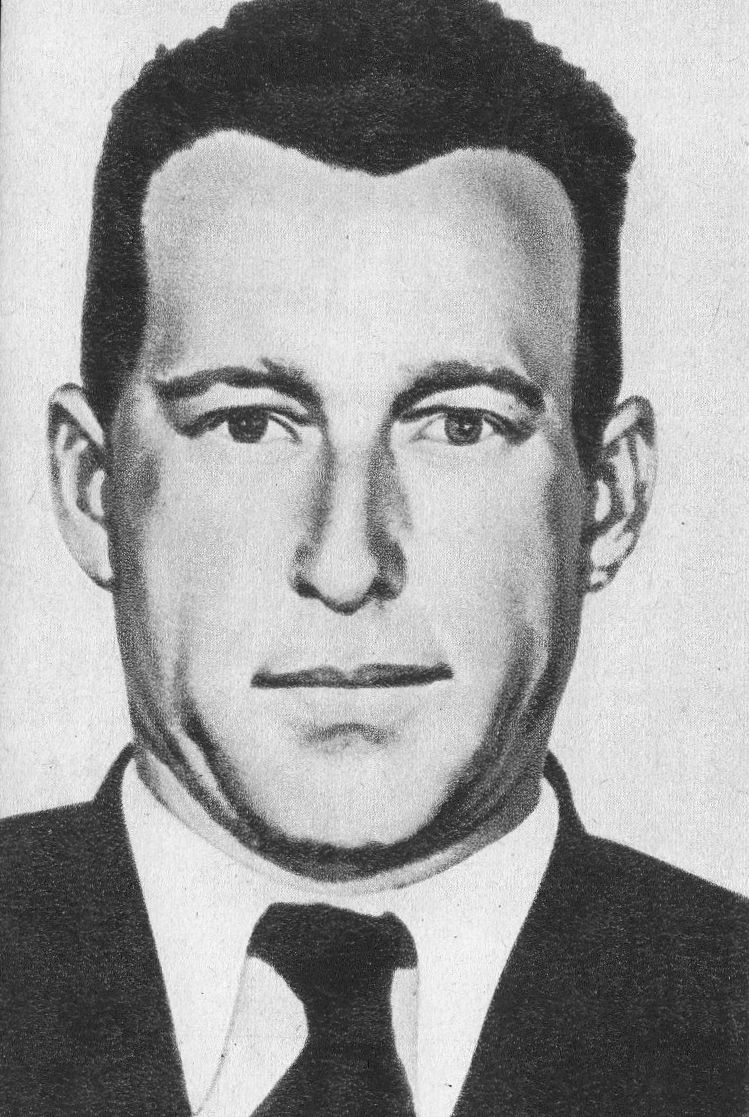
Franz Stangl

Stangl arrived at Treblinka in late August 1942. He replaced Eberl on 1 September. Years later, Stangl described what he first saw when he came on the scene, in a 1971 interview with Gitta Sereny:

The road ran alongside the railway. When we were about fifteen, twenty minutes' drive from Treblinka, we began to see corpses by the line, first just two or three, then more, and as we drove into Treblinka station, there were what looked like hundreds of them – just lying there – they'd obviously been there for days, in the heat. In the station was a train full of Jews, some dead, some still alive ... that too, looked as if it had been there for days.

Stangl reorganised the camp, and the transports of Warsaw and Jews from the Radom Ghetto began to arrive again on 3 September 1942. According to Israeli historian Yitzhak Arad, Stangl wanted the camp to look attractive, so he ordered the paths paved in the Wohnlager administrative compound. Flowers were planted along Seidel Straße as well as near the SS living quarters. He ordered that all arriving prisoners should be greeted by the SS with a verbal announcement translated by the working Jews. The deportees were told that they were at a transit point on the way to Ukraine. Some of their questions were answered by Germans wearing lab coats as tools for deception. At times Stangl carried a whip and wore a white uniform, so he was nicknamed the "White Death" by prisoners. Although he was directly responsible for the camp's operations, according to his own testimony Stangl limited his contact with Jewish prisoners as much as possible. He claimed that he rarely interfered with the cruel acts perpetrated by his subordinate officers at the camp. He became desensitised to the murders, and came to perceive prisoners not as humans but merely as "cargo" that had to be destroyed, he said.

==== Treblinka song ====
According to postwar testimonies, when transports were temporarily halted, then-deputy commandant Kurt Franz wrote lyrics to a song meant to celebrate the Treblinka extermination camp. In reality, prisoner Walter Hirsch wrote them for him. The melody came from something Franz remembered from Buchenwald. The music was upbeat, in the key of D major. The song was taught to Jews assigned to work in the Sonderkommando. They were forced to memorise it by nightfall of their first day at the camp. Unterscharführer Franz Suchomel recalled the lyrics as follows: "We know only the word of the Commander. / We know only obedience and duty. / We want to keep working, working, / until a bit of luck beckons us some time. Hurrah!"

A musical ensemble was formed, under duress, by Artur Gold, a popular Jewish prewar composer from Warsaw. He arranged the theme to the Treblinka song for the 10-piece prisoner orchestra which he conducted. Gold arrived in Treblinka in 1942 and played music in the SS mess hall at the Wohnlager on German orders. He died during the uprising.

=== Kurt Franz ===
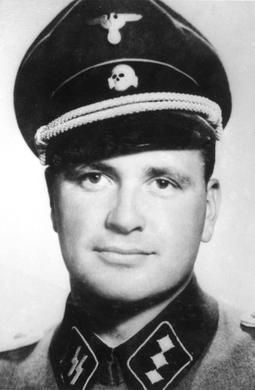
Kurt Franz, the third commandant of Treblinka

After the Treblinka revolt in August 1943, and termination of Operation Reinhard in October 1943, Stangl went with Globocnik to Trieste in northern Italy where SS reinforcements were needed. The third and last Treblinka II commandant was Kurt Franz, nicknamed "Lalka" by the prisoners (Polish: the doll) because he had "an innocent face". According to survivor testimonies, Franz shot and beat prisoners to death for minor infractions or had his dog Barry tear them to pieces. He managed Treblinka II until November 1943. The subsequent clean-up of the Treblinka II perimeter was completed by prisoners of nearby Treblinka I Arbeitslager in the following months. Franz's deputy was Hauptscharführer Fritz Küttner, who maintained a network of informers among the prisoners and did the hands-on murders.

Kurt Franz maintained a photo album against orders never to take photographs inside Treblinka. He named it Schöne Zeiten ("Good Times"). His album is a rare source of images illustrating the mechanised grave digging, brickworks in Małkinia and the Treblinka zoo, among others. Franz was careful not to photograph the gas chambers.

The Treblinka I gravel mine functioned at full capacity under the command of Theodor van Eupen until July 1944, with new forced labourers sent to him by Kreishauptmann Ernst Gramss from Sokołów. The mass shootings continued into 1944. With Soviet troops closing in, the last 300 to 700 prisoners disposing of the incriminating evidence were executed by Trawnikis in late July 1944, long after the camp's official closure. Strebel, the ethnic German who had been installed in the farmhouse built in place of the camp's original bakery using bricks from the gas chambers, set fire to the building and fled to avoid capture.

== Arrival of the Soviets ==
In late July 1944, Soviet forces approached from the east. The departing Germans, who had already destroyed most direct evidence of genocidal intent, burned surrounding villages to the ground, including 761 buildings in Poniatowo, Prostyń, and Grądy. Many families were murdered. The fields of grain that had once fed the SS were burned. On 19 August 1944, German forces blew up the church in Prostyń and its bell tower, the last defensive strongpoint against the Red Army in the area. When the Soviets entered Treblinka on 16 August, the extermination zone had been levelled, ploughed over, and planted with lupins. What remained, wrote visiting Soviet war correspondent Vasily Grossman, were small pieces of bone in the soil, human teeth, scraps of paper and fabric, broken dishes, jars, shaving brushes, rusted pots and pans, cups of all sizes, mangled shoes, and lumps of human hair. The road leading to the camp was pitch black. Until mid-1944 human ashes (up to 20 carts every day) had been regularly strewn by the remaining prisoners along the road for 2 km (1.2 mi) in the direction of Treblinka I. When the war ended, destitute and starving locals started walking up the Black Road (as they began to call it) in search of man-made nuggets shaped from melted gold in order to buy bread.

=== Postwar looting ===
After the end of the war in 1945, observers who visited the site of the Treblinka camp described extensive looting of the area by the local Polish population. Hoping to find valuables or gold, locals dug up the remains of Jews murdered in the camp. The writer Rokhl Auerbakh, who visited the camp in November of 1945, described the looting she observed as "the Gold Rush in Treblinka". Looting went on for more than a decade with diggers being present as late as 1958.

=== Early attempts at preservation ===
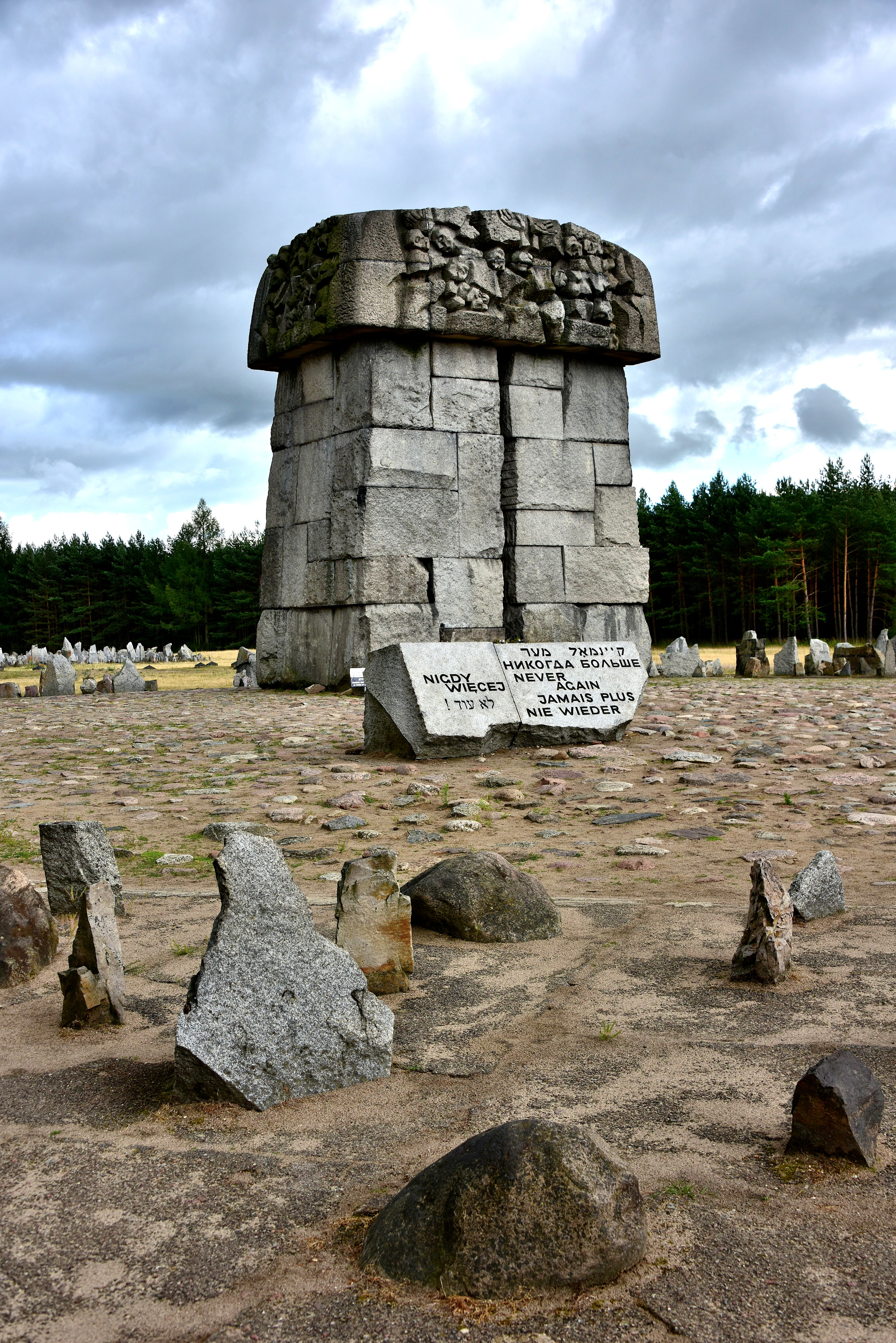
Treblinka memorial in 2018. Plaque states never again in several languages.

The new Soviet-installed government did not preserve evidence of the camp. The scene was not legally protected at the conclusion of World War II. In September 1947, 30 students from the local school, led by their teacher Feliks Szturo and priest Józef Ruciński, collected larger bones and skull fragments into farmers' wicker baskets and buried them in a single mound. The same year the first remembrance committee Komitet Uczczenia Ofiar Treblinki (KUOT; Committee for the Remembrance of the Victims of Treblinka) formed in Warsaw, and launched a design competition for the memorial.

Stalinist officials allocated no funding for the design competition nor for the memorial, and the committee disbanded in 1948; by then many survivors had left the country. In 1949, the town of Sokołów Podlaski protected the camp with a new fence and gate. A work crew with no archaeological experience was sent in to landscape the grounds. In 1958, after the end of Stalinism in Poland, the Warsaw provincial council declared Treblinka to be a place of martyrology. Over the next four years, 127 ha (310 acres) of land that had formed part of the camp was purchased from 192 farmers in the villages of Prostyń, Grądy, Wólka Okrąglik and Nowa Maliszewa.

=== Construction of the memorial ===
The construction of a monument 8 m (26 ft) in height designed by sculptor Franciszek Duszeńko was inaugurated on 21 April 1958 with the laying of the cornerstone at the site of the former gas chambers. The sculpture represents the trend toward large avant-garde forms introduced in the 1960s throughout Europe, with a granite tower cracked down the middle and capped by a mushroom-like block carved with abstract reliefs and Jewish symbols. Treblinka was declared a national monument of martyrology on 10 May 1964 during an official ceremony attended by 30,000 people. (Note: Translation from Polish: The official unveiling of the monument took place on 10 May 1964. At this time, the name was introduced of the Mausoleum of the Fight and Martyrdom. The ceremony was attended by 30,000 people. ... Original: "Oficjalne odsłonięcie pomnika odbyło się 10 maja 1964 r. Przyjęto wtedy nazwę tego miejsca – 'Mauzoleum Walki i Męczeństwa w Treblince'. W wydarzeniu tym uczestniczyło ok. 30 tys. osób. ... Odsłonięcia dokonał wicemarszałek Sejmu PRL – Zenon Kliszko. Wśród zebranych byli więźniowie Treblinki II: Jankiel Wiernik z Izraela, Richard Glazar z Czechosłowacji, Berl Duszkiewicz z Francji i Zenon Gołaszewski z Polski.") The monument was unveiled by Zenon Kliszko, the Marshal of the Sejm of the Republic of Poland, in the presence of survivors of the Treblinka uprising from Israel, France, Czechoslovakia and Poland. The camp custodian's house (built nearby in 1960) (Note: The custodian and the first director of the Treblinka camp museum was Tadeusz Kiryluk, who was originally from Wólka Okrąglik.) was turned into an exhibition space following the collapse of communism in Poland in 1989 and the retirement of the custodian; it opened in 2006. It was later expanded and made into a branch of the Siedlce Regional Museum.

== Victims ==
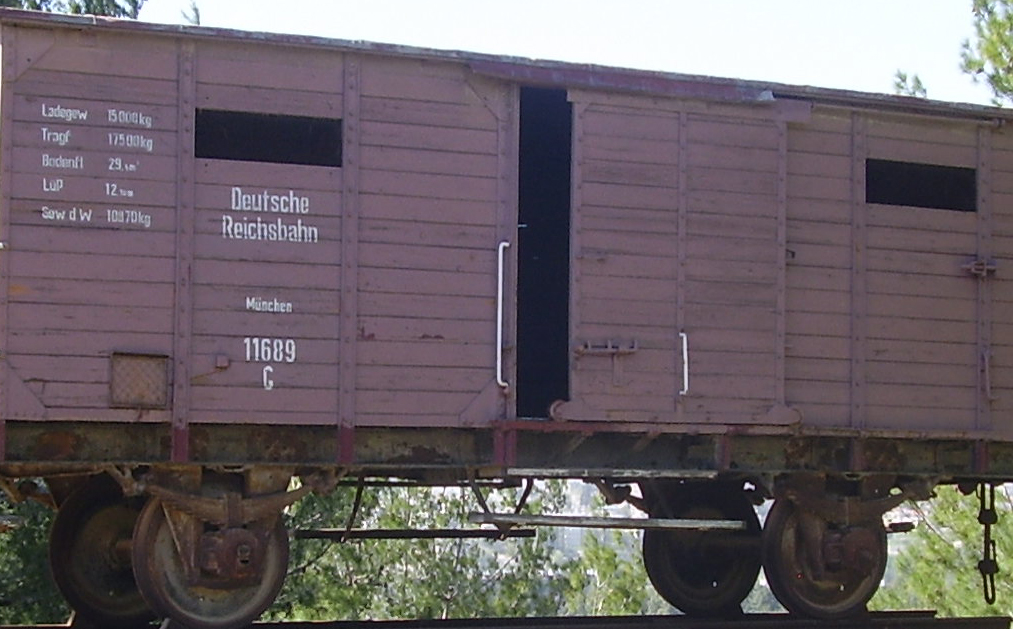
The Holocaust "Güterwagen" wagon holding an average of 100 victims, occupied Poland

There are many estimates of the total number of Jews murdered at Treblinka; most scholarly estimates give values that are within 700,000 to 925,000, meaning that more Jews were murdered at Treblinka than at any other Nazi extermination camp except for Auschwitz. The Treblinka museum in Poland states that at least 800,000 people were murdered at Treblinka; Israel's Holocaust museum, Yad Vashem, puts the number at 870,000; and the United States Holocaust Memorial Museum gives an estimate of 925,000.

=== First estimates ===
The first estimate of the number of people murdered at Treblinka came from Vasily Grossman, a Soviet war reporter who visited Treblinka in July 1944 as the Soviet forces marched westward across Poland. He published an article called "The Hell Called Treblinka", which appeared in the November 1944 issue of Znamya, a monthly Russian literary magazine. In the article, he claimed that 3 million people had been murdered at Treblinka. He may not have been aware that the short station platform at Treblinka II greatly reduced the number of wagons that could be unloaded at one time, and may have been adhering to the Soviet trend of exaggerating Nazi crimes for propaganda purposes. In 1947, the Polish historian Zdzisław Łukaszkiewicz gave an estimate of 780,000 murders, based on the accepted record of 156 transports with an average of 5,000 prisoners each.

=== Court exhibits and affidavits ===
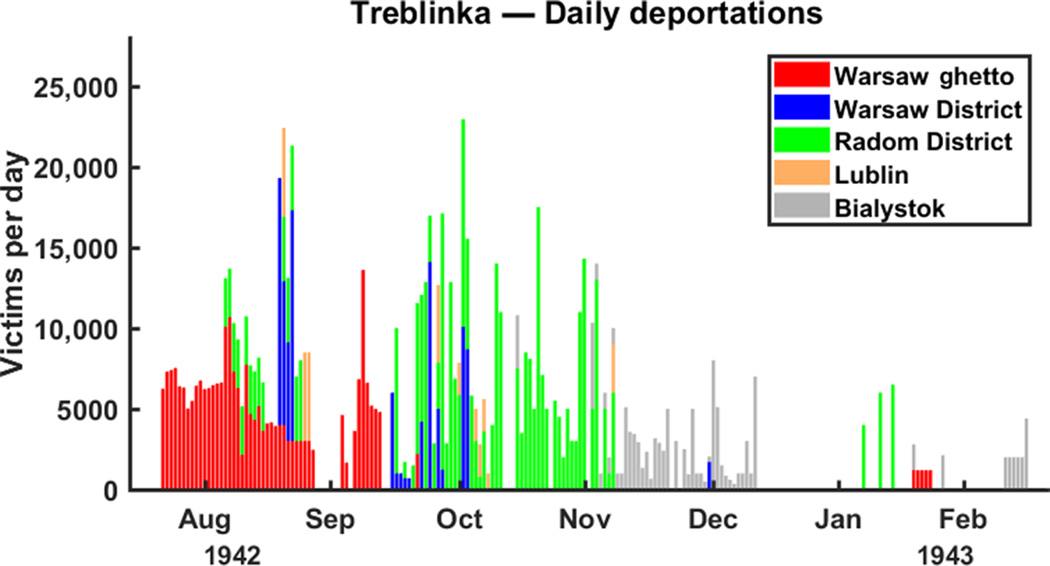
Daily deportations to Treblinka

The Treblinka trials of the 1960s took place in Düsseldorf and produced the two official West German estimates. During the 1965 trial of Kurt Franz, the Court of Assize in Düsseldorf concluded that at least 700,000 people were murdered at Treblinka, following a report by Dr. Helmut Krausnick, director of the Institute of Contemporary History. During Franz Stangl's trial in 1969, the same court reassessed the number to be at least 900,000 after new evidence from Dr. Wolfgang Scheffler.

A chief witness for the prosecution at Düsseldorf in the 1965, 1966, 1968 and 1970 trials was Franciszek Ząbecki, who was employed by the Deutsche Reichsbahn as a rail traffic controller at Treblinka village from 22 May 1941. In 1977 he published his book Old and New Memories, in which he used his own records to estimate that at least 1,200,000 people were murdered at Treblinka. His estimate was based on the maximum capacity of a trainset during the Grossaktion Warsaw of 1942 rather than its yearly average. The original German waybills in his possession did not have the number of prisoners listed. Ząbecki, a Polish member of railway staff before the war, was one of the few non-German witnesses to see most transports that came into the camp; he was present at the Treblinka station when the first Holocaust train arrived from Warsaw. Ząbecki was a member of the Armia Krajowa (Polish: Home Army), which formed most of the Polish resistance movement in World War II, and kept a daily record of the extermination transports. He also clandestinely photographed the burning Treblinka II perimeter during the uprising in August 1943. Ząbecki witnessed the last set of five enclosed freight wagons carrying Sonderkommandos to the Sobibór gas chambers on 20 October 1943. In 2013, his son Piotr Ząbecki wrote an article about him for Życie Siedleckie that revised the number to 1,297,000. Ząbecki's daily records of transports to the camp, and demographic information regarding the number of people deported from each ghetto to Treblinka, were the two main sources for estimates of the death toll.

In his 1987 book Belzec, Sobibor, Treblinka: The Operation Reinhard Death Camps, Israeli historian Yitzhak Arad stated that at least 763,000 people were murdered at Treblinka between July 1942 and April 1943. A considerable number of other estimates followed: see table (below).

=== Höfle telegram ===
A further source of information became available in 2001. The Höfle telegram was an encrypted message sent to Berlin on 31 December 1942 by Operation Reinhard deputy commander Hermann Höfle, detailing the number of Jews deported by DRB to each of the Operation Reinhard death camps up to that point. Discovered among declassified documents in Britain, it shows that by the official count of the German Transport Authority 713,555 Jews were sent to Treblinka in 1942. The number of murders was probably higher, according to the Armia Krajowa communiqués. (Note: The Armia Krajowa communiqués were published by the Polish Underground State through the Biuletyn Informacyjny newspaper (BI) on behalf of the exiled Polish government in London. It was the most widely read Underground publication in occupied Poland.) On the basis of the telegram and additional undated German evidence for 1943 listing 67,308 people deported, historian Jacek Andrzej Młynarczyk calculated that by the official DRB count, 780,863 people were brought by Deutsche Reichsbahn to Treblinka.

=== Table of estimates ===
Estimate	Source	Notes	Year	Work
at least 700,000	Helmut Krausnick	first West German estimate; used during trial of Kurt Franz	1965	
at least 700,000	Adalbert Rückerl	Director of the Central Authority for Investigation into Nazi Crime in Ludwigsburg	N/A	
at least 700,000	Joseph Billig	French historian	1973	
700,000–800,000	Czesław Madajczyk	Polish historian	1970	
700,000–900,000	Robin O'Neil	from Belzec: Stepping Stone to Genocide; Hitler's answer to the Jewish Question, published by JewishGen Yizkor Books Project	2008	
713,555	Höfle telegram	discovered in 2001; official Nazi estimate up to the end of 1942	1942	
at least 750,000	Michael Berenbaum	from his encyclopedia entry on Treblinka	2012	Encyclopædia Britannica
at least 750,000	Raul Hilberg	American Holocaust historian	1985	The Destruction of European Jews
780,000	Zdzisław Łukaszkiewicz	Polish historian responsible for the first estimate of the number of murders based on 156 transports with 5,000 prisoners each, published in his monograph Obóz zagłady w Treblince	1947	
780,863	Jacek Andrzej Młynarczyk	cited by Timothy Snyder; combines Höfle telegram with undated German evidence from 1943	2004	
at least 800,000	Treblinka camp museum	uses Franciszek Ząbecki's evidence and evidence from the ghettos	N/A	
850,000	Yitzhak Arad	Israeli historian who estimates 763,000 deaths between July 1942 and April 1943 alone	1983	Treblinka, Hell and Revolt
at least 850,000	Martin Gilbert	British historian	1993	
870,000	Yad Vashem	Israel's Holocaust museum	N/A	
870,000 to 925,000	United States Holocaust Museum	from "Treblinka: Chronology" article; excludes the deaths from forced labour in Treblinka I	N/A	
876,000	Simon Wiesenthal Center	738,000 Jews from the General Government; 107,000 from Białystok; 29,000 Jews from elsewhere in Europe; and 2,000 Gypsies	N/A	
at least 900,000	Wolfgang Scheffler	second West German estimate; used during trial of Franz Stangl	1970	
912,000	Manfred Burba	German historian	2000	
at least 1,200,000	Franciszek Ząbecki	Polish eyewitness	1977	Old and New Memories
1,297,000	Piotr Ząbecki	revision of Franciszek Ząbecki's estimate by his son Piotr	2013	He was a humble man
1,582,000	Ryszard Czarkowski	Polish historian	1989	
3,000,000	Vasily Grossman	Soviet reporter	1946	The Hell of Treblinka

- The information in the rows with an empty last column comes from Dam im imię na wieki, page 114.

== Treblinka trials ==
Treblinka survivor Samuel Raizman testifies before the International Military Tribunal, 27 February 1946

The first major trial for war crimes committed at Treblinka was held in Düsseldorf between 12 October 1964 and 24 August 1965, preceded by the 1951 trial of SS-Scharführer Josef Hirtreiter, which was triggered by charges of war crimes unrelated to his service at the camp. (Note: The Treblinka trials were preceded by the 1951 Frankfurt am Main trial of SS-Scharführer Josef Hirtreiter, who was charged with complicity in the gassing of patients at the Hadamar Killing Facility. Further investigation revealed that he had supervised the undressing of prisoners at Treblinka and personally killed many children (see also: The Hirtreiter trial).) The trial was delayed due to the decreased interest by the United States and the Soviet Union in prosecuting German war crimes with the onset of the Cold War. Many of the more than 90,000 Nazi war criminals recorded in German files were serving in positions of prominence under West German chancellor Konrad Adenauer. In 1964 and 1965, eleven former SS camp personnel were brought to trial by West Germany, including commandant Kurt Franz. He was sentenced to life imprisonment, along with Artur Matthes (Totenlager) and Willi Mentz and August Miete (both from Lazarett). Gustav Münzberger (gas chambers) received 12 years, Franz Suchomel (gold and money) 7 years, Otto Stadie (operation) 6 years, Erwin Lambert (gas chambers) 4 years, and Albert Rum (Totenlager) 3 years. Otto Horn (corpse detail) was acquitted.

The second commandant of Treblinka II, Franz Stangl, escaped with his wife and children from Austria to Brazil in 1951. Stangl found work at a Volkswagen factory in São Paulo. His role in the mass murder of Jews was known to the Austrian authorities, but Austria did not issue a warrant for his arrest until 1961. Stangl was registered under his real name at the Austrian consulate in Brazil. It took another six years before Nazi hunter Simon Wiesenthal tracked him down and triggered his arrest. After his extradition from Brazil to West Germany, Stangl was tried for the murders of around 900,000 people. He admitted to the murders but argued: "My conscience is clear. I was simply doing my duty." Stangl was found guilty on 22 October 1970, and sentenced to life imprisonment. He died of heart failure in prison in Düsseldorf on 28 June 1971.

Between the 1940s and early 1960s, the Soviet Union prosecuted 21 people for crimes committed at Treblinka. All of them were executed or died in prison. In 1986, the Soviet Union tried another Treblinka guard, Feodor Fedorenko. Fedorenko had moved to the United States before being his crimes were exposed, resulting in him being stripped of his American citizenship and deported to the Soviet Union. Fedorenko was sentenced to death and executed in 1987.

=== Material gain ===
The theft of cash and valuables, collected from the victims of gassing, was conducted by the higher-ranking SS men on an enormous scale. It was a common practice among the concentration camps' top echelon everywhere; two Majdanek concentration camp commandants, Koch and Florstedt, were tried and executed by the SS for the same offence in April 1945. When the top-ranking officers went home, they would sometimes request a private locomotive from Klinzman and Emmerich (Note: Rudolf Emmerich and Willi Klinzman were the two native German railwaymen posted at the Treblinka station after the gas chambers went into operation. Their express role was to direct the movement of the Holocaust trains to the death camp.) at the Treblinka station to transport their personal "gifts" to Małkinia for a connecting train. Then, they would drive out of the camp in cars without any incriminating evidence on their person, and later arrive at Małkinia to transfer the goods. (Note: See Ząbecki's court testimonies at Düsseldorf.)

The overall amount of material gain by Nazi Germany is unknown except for the period between 22 August and 21 September 1942, when there were 243 wagons of goods sent and recorded. Globocnik delivered a written tally to Reinhard headquarters on 15 December 1943 with the SS profit of ℛℳ 178,745,960.59, including 2,909.68 kg (93,548 ozt) of gold, 18,733.69 kg (602,302 ozt; 41,300.7 lb) of silver, 1,514 kg (48,700 ozt) of platinum, and 249,771.50 American dollars, as well as 130 diamond solitaires, 2,511.87 carats (502.374 g) of brilliants, 13,458.62 carats (2.692 kg) of diamonds, and 114 kg (251 lb) of pearls. The amount of loot Globocnik stole is unknown; Suchomel claimed in court to have filled a box with one million Reichsmarks for him.

== Archaeological studies ==
One of the tiles found during the archaeological dig, providing the first physical evidence for the existence of the gas chambers at Treblinka

Approval for a limited archaeological study was issued for the first time in 2010 to a British team from Staffordshire University using non-invasive technology and Lidar remote sensing. The soil resistance was analysed at the site with ground-penetrating radar. Features that appeared to be structural were found, two of which were thought to be the remains of the gas chambers, and the study was allowed to continue.

The archaeological team performing the search discovered three new mass graves. The remains were reinterred out of respect for the victims. At the second dig the findings included yellow tiles stamped with a pierced mullet star resembling a Star of David, and building foundations with a wall. The star was soon identified as the logo of Polish ceramics factory manufacturing floor tiles, founded by Jan Dziewulski and brothers Józef and Władysław Lange (Dziewulski i Lange – D✡L since 1886), nationalised and renamed under communism after the war. As explained by forensic archaeologist Caroline Sturdy Colls, the new evidence was important because the second gas chambers built at Treblinka were housed in the only brick building in the camp; Colls claimed that this provides the first physical evidence for their existence. In his memoir describing his stay in the camp, survivor Jankiel Wiernik says that the floor in the gas chambers (which he helped build) was made of similar tiles. The discoveries became a subject of the 2014 documentary by the Smithsonian Channel. More forensic work has been planned.

== Operation Reinhard leadership and Treblinka commandants ==
Name	Rank	Function and Notes	Citation
Operation Reinhard leadership
Odilo Globocnik	SS-Hauptsturmführer and SS-Polizeiführer at the time (captain and SS Police Chief)	head of Operation Reinhard	
Hermann Höfle	SS-Hauptsturmführer (captain)	coordinator of Operation Reinhard	
Christian Wirth	SS-Hauptsturmführer at the time (captain)	inspector for Operation Reinhard	
Richard Thomalla	SS-Obersturmführer at the time (first lieutenant)	head of death camp construction during Operation Reinhard	
Erwin Lambert	SS-Unterscharführer (corporal)	head of gas chamber construction during Operation Reinhard (large gas chambers)	
Treblinka commandants
Theodor van Eupen	SS-Sturmbannführer (major), Commandant of Treblinka I Arbeitslager, 15 November 1941 – July 1944 (cleanup)	head of the forced-labour camp	
Irmfried Eberl	|transferred to Berlin due to incompetence		
Franz Stangl	|transferred to Treblinka from Sobibor extermination camp		
Kurt Franz	SS-Untersturmführer (second lieutenant), last Commandant of Treblinka II, August (gassing) – November 1943	promoted from deputy commandant in August 1943 following camp prisoner revolt	
Deputy commandants
Karl Pötzinger	SS-Oberscharführer (staff sergeant), Deputy commandant of Treblinka II	head of cremation	
Heinrich Matthes	SS-Scharführer (sergeant), Deputy commandant	chief of the extermination area	

== See also ==
- Operation Treblinka
