= Wolfgang Scheffler (historian) =

German historian (1929–2008)

Wolfgang Scheffler (22 July 1929, in Leipzig – 18 November 2008, in Berlin) was a German historian. He was a graduate and later, Professor of Political Science and History at the Free University of Berlin. In the 1960s, he was engaged in massive research of the Third Reich National Socialist policy toward the Jews in unpublished archival material, on behalf of Deutsche Forschungsgemeinschaft (DFG). He was a member of the German delegation at the Eichmann trial. In 1969, at the second Treblinka trial Scheffler submitted his expert opinion based on new evidence, estimating the total number of persons killed at the Treblinka extermination camp to be around 900,000 victims.

== Bibliography ==
- Book of Remembrance. The German, Austrian and Czechoslovakian Jews deported to the Baltic States, 2 volumes, Saur Verlag, Munich 2003 (with Diana Schulle, in German and English)
- Judenverfolgung Im Dritten Reich, 1933–1945 [Persecution of Jews under the Third Reich], Colloquium Verlag, Berlin 1960 (six editions)
- Reinhard Heydrich; Himmler, Heinrich in: Neue Deutsche Biographie, Duncker & Humblot, Berlin 1972
- Goldschmiede Rheinland-Westfalens: Daten, Werke, Zeichen (1973)
- Der Beitrag der Zeitgeschichte zur Erforschung der NS-Verbrechen, Munich 1984
- Gemalte Goldschmiedearbeiten (1985)
- Goldschmiede Oberfrankens: Daten, Werke, Zeichen (1989)
- Der Ghetto-Aufstand Warschau 1943, Goldmann Wilhelm GmbH 1993 (with Helge Grabitz)

== Notes and references ==
- This article incorporates text from the corresponding article in German Wikipedia
