= Richard Glazar =

Czech-Jewish Holocaust survivor and memoirist (1920–1997)

- Richard Glazar on the cover of his book titled Trap with a Green Fence
- Born: Richard Goldschmied; 29 November 1920; Prague, Czechoslovakia
- Died: 20 December 1997 (aged 77); Prague, Czech Republic
- Known for: Treblinka survivor, author of Treblinka memoir

Richard Glazar (29 November 1920 – 20 December 1997) was a Czech-Jewish inmate of the Treblinka extermination camp in German-occupied Poland during the Holocaust. One of a small group of survivors of the camp's prisoner revolt in August 1943, Glazar described his experiences in an autobiographical book, Trap with a Green Fence: Survival in Treblinka (1992).

== Early life and family ==
Glazar was born Richard Goldschmid in Prague, Czechoslovakia, to a Jewish-Czech family who spoke both Czech and German. His father served in the Austro-Hungarian Army before independence. His parents divorced in 1932, and his mother married a wealthy leather merchant, Quido Bergmann, who already had two children, Karel and Adolf. Karel died in the Austrian Mauthausen-Gusen concentration camp on 17 May 1942. Adolf went in October 1939 to Denmark with the Youth Aliyah organization, escaped in October 1943 to Sweden (Denmark was occupied by Nazi Germany in 1940–1945). In 1944–1945, he served as a volunteer in the Free Czechoslovak Army in the United Kingdom and France, and was later awarded the Czechoslovak War Cross. He later earned the degree of B.Sc. in dairy technology at the Agriculture University of Denmark. Richard and Adolf met after World War II and continued to have contact until the end of Richard's life.

Glazar's father died of pneumonia in the Soviet Union, to which he had escaped from the Nisko reservation in the General Government of occupied Poland; some 1,100 Czech Jews had been deported there by the Nazis in 1939. Glazar's mother survived both Auschwitz and Bergen-Belsen, and was the only member of his family left when he returned to Prague in 1945. His stepbrother Adolf Dasha Bergmann also survived after having served in the Czechoslovak army in France and was in Prague, when Richard returned to Prague in 1945.

== Education ==
Glazar was accepted into the Charles University in Prague in June 1939. He was originally enrolled as a philosophy student, but anti-Jewish legislation after the German occupation forced him into a course reading economics. His entire family had the chance to move to England at Christmas in 1938, when his stepfather obtained a permit. His stepfather did not take this opportunity, as he did not want to leave behind all that he had built up in Czechoslovakia.

On 17 November 1939, all Czech universities were closed until the end of the war, following student demonstrations against the execution of a number of their fellow students. This act would have been one of the Glazar family's first warnings of the horrific events to follow, and fearing for his safety, his family sent him to a farm outside Prague in 1940. Glazar stayed there for two years. On 12 September 1942, he was transported to the Nazi concentration camp Theresienstadt Ghetto (previously the fortified town of Terezín, located 35 miles north of Prague). Following the German occupation of the rest of Czechoslovakia on 15 March 1939, Theresienstadt became a holding area for transports to other concentration camps, such as Auschwitz.

In Terezín, Glazar met Karel Unger, who became a close friend. Glazar was to stay in Terezín for only one month, before he and Unger were transported to Treblinka on 8 October1942.

== Treblinka ==
Glazar wrote his story down after the war, and had part of it published in 1967 in a Czech magazine, Mezinárodní politika. In 1979 he was interviewed by Claude Lanzmann for the documentary Shoah (1985). When Glazar moved to Switzerland after the Prague Spring, his memoir was published in full in German as Die Falle mit dem grünen Zaun: Überleben in Treblinka (1992). An English translation, Trap with a Green Fence: Survival in Treblinka, was published in 1995 by Northwestern University Press.

In Shoah, Glazar described his arrival at Treblinka:

We were taken to a barracks. The whole place stank. Piled about five feet high in a jumbled mass, were all the things people could conceivably have brought. Clothes, suitcases, everything stacked in a solid mass. On top of it, jumping around like demons, people were making bundles and carrying them outside. It was turned over to one of these men. His armband said "Squad Leader". He shouted, and I understood that I was also to pick up clothing, bundle it, and take it somewhere. As I worked, I asked him: "What's going on? Where are the ones who stripped?" And he replied: "Dead! All Dead!" But it still hadn't sunk in, I didn't believe it. He'd used the Yiddish word. It was the first time I'd had heard Yiddish spoken. He didn’t say it very loud, and I saw he had tears in his eyes. Suddenly, he started shouting, and raised his whip. Out of the corner of my eye I saw an SS man coming. And I understood that I was to ask no more questions, but just to rush outside with the package.

New arrivals at Treblinka were ordered to strip, then herded into gas chambers disguised as communal showers; exhaust gas was pumped in instead of water. Glazar was instead selected for forced labor along with a friend, Karel Unger. He described in his book the packing of victims' clothes for shipment to Germany, and how the gold from teeth was extracted and, together with coins and jewelry, added to the German loot. Food brought by the victims helped sustain both the SS and the Ukrainian guards, along with inmates who would steal it at the unloading ramp.

== The revolt ==
After the big transports from Grodno and Białystok ghettos in January 1943, in February and March 1943 no transports came into the camp. The Sonderkommando had virtually no food, which made the Jewish inmates realize that their lives depended on the transports arriving regularly.

It was this knowledge that drove them to try to escape. The first escape attempt was planned for January 1943 and was code-named "The Hour". The idea was that at a specified time, all those working for the camp would attack the SS and Ukrainian guards, steal their weapons, and attack the camp Kommandantur. Unfortunately, this did not proceed, as typhus broke out, and many inmates either died, were hospitalized, or were too sick to participate. The escape that actually worked was less violent and ambitious: on 2 August 1943, men broke out through a damaged gate during a prisoner's revolt. Most of the escapees were arrested close to the camp, but Glazar and Unger fled from the area and made their way across Poland.

While on the run, they were arrested by a forester, but managed to convince him that they were Czechs working for "Organisation Todt" (a Nazi construction and engineering group in Poland). Both men were later sent to Mannheim in Germany, to work for Heinrich Lanz as immigrant workers, using falsified papers.

== Life after the war ==
Following the end of the war, when Glazar and Unger were liberated by the Americans, Glazar attended the trials of many of the Nazis associated with Treblinka, including Franz Stangl. Glazar also went on to study in Prague, Paris and London, and received a degree in economics. In 1968 he and his family moved to Switzerland after the invasion of Czechoslovakia by the armies of the Warsaw Pact.

== Death ==
Glazar helped Michael Peters, the founder of the Aktion Reinhard Camps (a network of private Holocaust researchers), build a model of Treblinka. Glazar died by suicide on 20 December 1997, by jumping out of a window in Prague after the death of his wife, leaving the model unfinished.

== See also ==
- List of Holocaust survivors
