= Artur Gold =

Polish Jewish violinist and dance-music composer

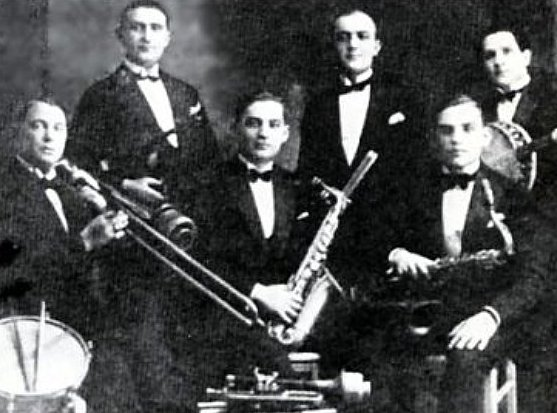
The Gold-Petersburski Orchestra, Artur Gold in the back row, left.

Artur (Arthur) Gold (born 17 March 1897, Warsaw, died 1943 in Treblinka) was a Polish Jewish violinist and dance-music composer during the Interbellum. He closely collaborated with his brother Henryk Gold and with Jerzy Petersburski with whom he arranged music for his famous ensembles; they were among the most popular composers in interwar Poland and many of their hits were sung throughout the whole country. Gold ran an orchestra in the Qui Pro Quo theater (1922) and in the Warsaw "Adria" night club (1931–1939).

== Life ==
Artur Gold was the second son of Michał Gold, a musician in the Warsaw Opera; when Michał died an uncle took Artur to England, where he received his musical education. He later returned to Warsaw and played there for various venues including nightclubs. Some of his noted compositions were the foxtrot Gdy Petersburski razem z Goldem gra ("When Petersburski and Gold play together") (1926), the tango Gdy w ogrodzie botanicznym ("While in the botanical garden"), Jesienne róże ("Autumn roses"), Nie odchodź ode mnie (Don't walk away from me), Nie wierzę ci ("I don't trust you'"), Jaśminy (Jasmine), Kwiaciarka z Barcelony (Flower girl from Barcelona), Oczy czarne (Black Eyes), Ostatni jeszcze, and others. Most of the lyrics were by Andrzej Włast.

Artur Gold also performed with English orchestras in the 1920s and recorded for Columbia records. In the 1930s he also recorded several albums for the Polish "Odeon" record company.

== Treblinka extermination camp ==
After the German and Soviet invasion on Poland in September 1939, Artur Gold was forced into the newly created Warsaw Ghetto, in which he played with an orchestra. He was deported by the Germans with thousands of fellow inmates who boarded the Holocaust trains at the Umschlagplatz in Warsaw, destined for the gas chambers of German Treblinka extermination camp. He was not killed upon arrival there in 1942. He played for the Nazis in their casino, at least on one occasion dressed as a clown. He was murdered in 1943 in Treblinka. According to recollections of some of the Treblinka survivors Gold might have been killed during the uprising at Treblinka which occurred on 2 August 1943.

The melody of his song Chodź na Pragę (Come to Praga) (1930) is currently played as a Hejnał of the Warsaw borough of Praga, each day at noon.
