= Embassy of Israel, Berlin =

Embassy of Israel in Berlin
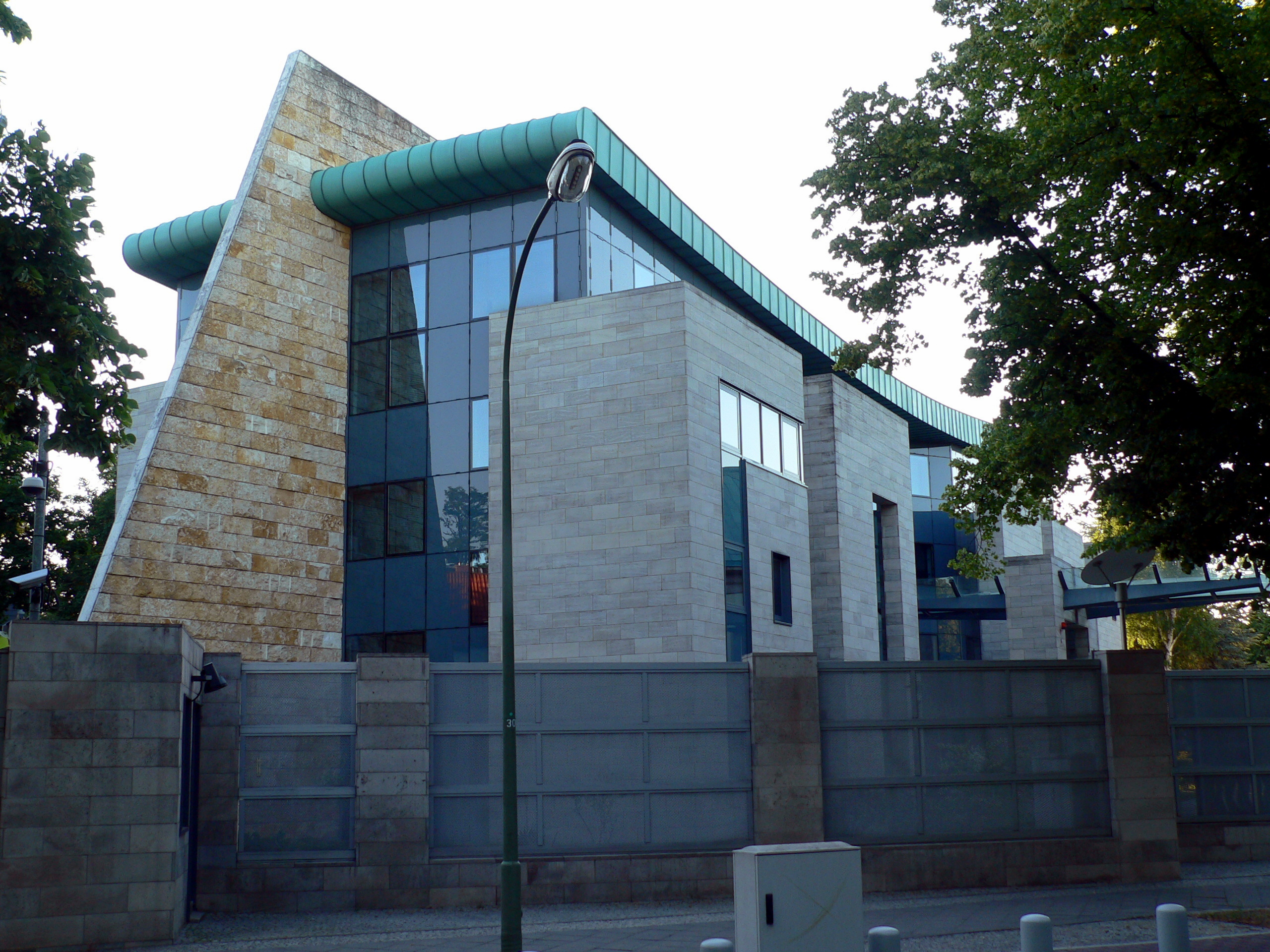
- Location: Schmargendorf, Berlin
- Address: Auguste-Viktoria-Straße 74, Berlin
- Coordinates: 52.4834°N 13.2887°E
- Ambassador: Ron Prosor

The Israeli Embassy in Berlin is the headquarters of the diplomatic mission of Israel in Germany. It is located in the Berlin district of Schmargendorf at Auguste-Viktoria-Straße 74. Since August 22, 2022, the Israeli ambassador to Germany is Ron Prosor.

== History ==
There have been diplomatic relations between the state of Israel and West Germany since 1965. The first embassy, opened on August 24, 1965, was located in Cologne's Ehrenfeld district. The following year, the embassy was moved to the Bad Godesberg district of Bonn. With the relocation of the German seat of government after unification, the Israeli embassy was moved in August 1999 from Bonn to Berlin. Until then there had been an Israeli Consulate-General at Schinkelstraße 10 in the Grunewald district of West Berlin.

The current embassy building was built in the period 1999–2001. It was designed by Israeli architect Orit Willenberg-Giladi. She is the daughter of the late Samuel Willenberg, the last known survivor of the August 1943 Treblinka revolt, and his wife Ada. In 2013 she was selected to design the Holocaust education center planned for the former site of Treblinka extermination camp.

== Ambassadors in Germany ==
No.	Portrait	Ambassador of Israel to Germany	Took office	Left office	Ref.
1	Asher Ben-Natan	Asher Ben-Natan (1921–2014)	August 1965	1970	
2	Eliashiv Ben-Horin	Eliashiv Ben-Horin (1921–1990)	1970	1974	
3	Yohanan Meroz	Yohanan Meroz (1920–2006)	1974	1981	
3	Itzhak Ben Ari	Itzhak Ben Ari (1924–2004)	1981	1989	
4	Binyamin Navon	Binyamin Navon (born 1933)	1989	1993	
5	Avraham "Avi“ Primor	Avraham "Avi“ Primor (born 1933)	1993	1999	
6	Shimon Stein	Shimon Stein (born 1948)	2001	2007	
7	Yoram Ben-Zeev	Yoram Ben-Zeev (born 1944)	2007	2012	
8	Yacov Hadas-Handelsman	Yacov Hadas-Handelsman (born 1957)	2012	2017	
9	Jeremy Issacharoff	Jeremy Issacharoff (born 1955)	2017	2022	
10	Ron Prosor	Ron Prosor (born 1958)	2022	Incumbent	

== See also ==
- Germany–Israel relations
