= Berek Lajcher =

Jewish physician and social activist

Dr. Berek Lajcher
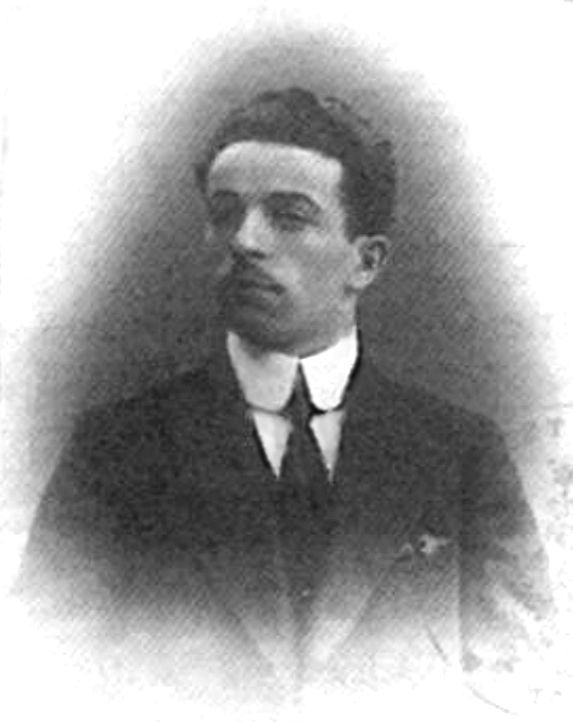
- Photograph from the university years
- Born: 24 October 1893; Częstochowa, Piotrków Governorate, Vistula Land
- Died: 2 August 1943 (aged 49); Treblinka extermination camp, Poland
- Occupation: Medical doctor
- Known for: Holocaust resistance

Berek Lajcher (24 October 1893 – 2 August 1943) was a Jewish physician and social activist from Wyszków before the Holocaust in Poland, remembered for his leadership in the prisoner uprising at Treblinka extermination camp. More than 800,000 Jews, as well as unknown numbers of Romani people, were murdered at Treblinka in the course of Operation Reinhard in World War II.

Lajcher was a graduate of the Warsaw University Faculty of Medicine in 1924, and a retired officer of the Polish Army from the Polish–Soviet War. After the German invasion of Poland during World War II, Lajcher was expelled by the Nazis along with all Polish Jews from Wyszków, and relocated to Węgrów, from where he was deported to Treblinka, the secret forest camp where Jewish men, women and children were being murdered in gas chambers.

Lajcher became the leader and clandestine organizer of the Treblinka revolt. On 2 August 1943, after a long period of preparation, the prisoners stole some weapons from the arsenal and made an attempt at an armed escape from the Totenlager. Lajcher was killed in the fighting. Several Trawniki guards were killed and some 150 Jewish prisoners escaped. Gassing operations at the camp ended soon after the revolt. Lajcher was remembered by survivors incorrectly as either Dr. Lecher (sic), or Dr. Leichert from Wegrów.

== Life and death ==
Berek Lajcher was born in Częstochowa under the Russian Partition, into a family of assimilated Polish Jews. He was the fourth of six children of Szmul (Shmuel) and Chai (Chaya) Lajcher née Frydman. His father spoke Yiddish, Polish, and Russian. They lived near the city centre in a house at Stary Rynek 11. Berek occasionally used his Polonized name, Bernard. He attended the multicultural State Henryk Sienkiewicz Secondary for boys in 1907. A year after graduation, in 1915, his father died. Berek moved to the capital and enrolled at the Warsaw University Faculty of Medicine. He supported himself financially by working as a part-time tutor.

Lajcher graduated in Medicine in 1924 and married Eugenia Banasz. After two years of internship in Warsaw, in 1927 they relocated to Wyszkow where the Polish and Jewish population was split half and half. The Lajchers remained there until the invasion of Poland.

=== The Holocaust in occupied Poland ===
At the very beginning of World War II, all Polish Jews of Wyszków, including Lajchers' family, were expelled by the Nazis in one massive action of 4 September 1939. The older 77 Jews, along with 8 Poles who were helping them, were locked in a barn and burned alive. Later that month, another 65 Jews were shot; afterward the town was declared Judenfrei. The Lajchers relocated to Węgrów, which was already swelling with hundreds of expellees. In the summer of 1940, Lajcher joined the local Jewish council and organized a hospital. In February 1941 the ghetto was closed off from the outside and hunger set in amongst its inmates. Lajcher wrote letters to the American Jewish Joint Distribution Committee, but in vain.

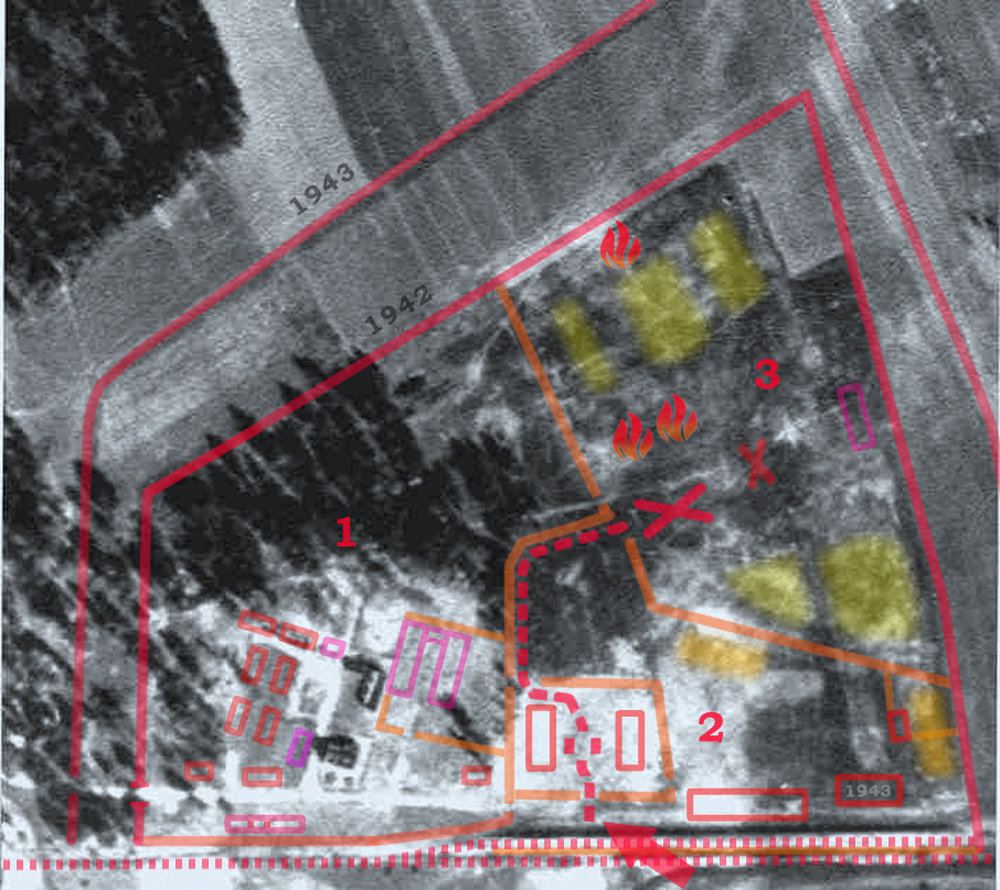
The 1944 aerial photo of Treblinka II after the camp's shut-down. The photograph is overlaid with dismantled structures including German "armoury" in the lower-left to the unloading platform (centre, marked with the red arrow)

The extermination of Jews by semi-industrial means throughout the country began in early 1942 and continued until all Jewish ghettos in German-occupied Poland were liquidated. The first Węgrów ghetto action began at dawn on 21 September and concluded on 22 September 1942, with up to 5,000 Jews expelled to Sokołów Podlaski after a wave of ad hoc executions. A small ghetto was created in its place. Following the liquidation of the small ghetto in Wegrów on 26–27 April 1943, during which his wife and 13-year-old son were murdered, Lajcher was brought to Treblinka in a Holocaust train on 1 May 1943.

Treblinka was built as part of the most deadly phase of the Final Solution, known as Aktion Reinhard, and operated between 23 July 1942 and 19 October 1943. During this time, more than 800,000 Jews – men, women, and children – were murdered there, with other estimates exceeding 1,000,000 victims.

In Treblinka, Lajcher was put in charge of a small infirmary for the SS after the suicide of his predecessor, Dr. Julian Chorążycki (not to be mistaken with the "fake" infirmary called "lazaret" where the hands-on killing took place). Asked by the Underground, according to Samuel Rajzman, he also agreed to take the leadership in their secret escape plan. The Organizing Committee at Treblinka Totenlager included Zelomir Bloch (leadership), Rudolf Masaryk, Marceli Galewski, Samuel Rajzman, Dr. Irena Lewkowska (sick bay), Leon Haberman, and several others. The timing became imperative after Chorążycki was ambushed by Kurt Franz and swallowed a deadly poison. Lajcher launched the uprising on a hot summer day when a group of Germans and Ukrainians drove off to the Bug River for a swim.

=== Treblinka uprising ===
On 2 August 1943 (Monday, a day of rest from gassing), the heavy door to the Nazi "arsenal" near the train tracks was silently unlocked by the Jews and some 20 rifles, 20 hand grenades and several pistols were stolen in a cart. At 3:45 p.m. some 700 Jewish prisoners launched the attack on the gates. They splashed gasoline in some buildings and set them ablaze, including a tank of petrol that exploded. Many of them tried to climb over the fence, but most were hit by machine-gun fire. Only between 150 and 200 Jews succeeded in crossing over to the other side. Half were killed after a chase in cars and on horses. Some of those who escaped successfully were transported across the river by the partisans of the Armia Krajowa hiding in the surrounding forest. Only about 70 Jews are known to have survived until the end of the war, including future authors of published Treblinka memoirs: Jankiel Wiernik, Chil Rajchman, Richard Glazar, and Samuel Willenberg. There was also a revolt at Sobibor two months later.
