= Zina Kalay-Kleitman =

Israeli diplomat

- זינה קלעי-קלייטמן
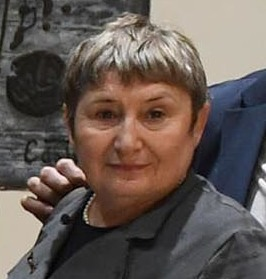
- Kalay-Kleitman in January 2018

Ambassador of Israel to Croatia
- In office 2014–2018
- Preceded by: Yossi Amrani
- Succeeded by: Ilan Mor

Ambassador of Israel to Ukraine
- In office 2007–2011
- Preceded by: Naomi Ben-Ami
- Succeeded by: Reuven Din El

Zina Kalay-Kleitman (Hebrew: זינה קלעי-קלייטמן) was the Ambassador of Israel to Croatia from 2014 until 2018 and Ukraine from 2007 until 2011.
