= Ilan Mor =

Israeli diplomat

His Excellency Ilan Mor
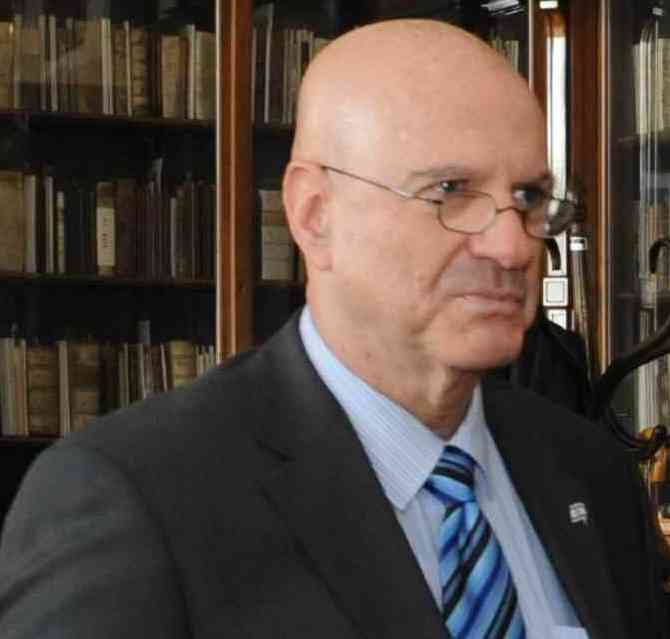

Israeli Ambassador to Croatia
- In office 2018 – 2022
- Preceded by: Zina Kleitman

Israeli Ambassador to Hungary
- In office 2011 – 2016
- Preceded by: Aliza Bin-Noun
- Succeeded by: Yossi Amrani

Personal details
- Education: Tel Aviv University
- Occupation: Ambassador

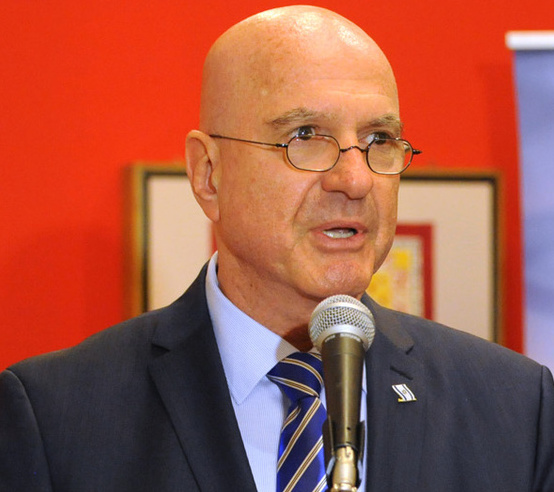
Ilan Mor

Ilan Mor is the Ambassador of Israel to Croatia. He was also Ambassador to Hungary between 2011 and 2016.

Mor earned a B.A. in Political Science and Working Relations and an M.A. in International Relations both from Tel Aviv University.

== Returned Táncsics award ==
On March 14, 2013, the Hungarian Human Resources Minister Zoltán Balog awarded Ferenc Szaniszló the Táncsics award, Hungary's highest state award for journalism. A dozen former recipients of the Táncsics returned their awards in protest, due to Szaniszló's history of controversy including a 2011 incident which resulted in a government fine over, according to The Independent, "anti-Semitic outbursts and his detrimental remarks about the country’s ostracised Roma minority," including calling Roma "human monkeys" and suggesting he regarded Jews as garbage.

Szaniszló's receipt of the award was not only criticized by Mor but also the Hungarian and international media and by U.S. ambassador Eleni Tsakopoulos Kounalakis.

== Personal life ==
Mor was born in Israel but his parents came from Romania and Poland. They survived the Holocaust but numerous relatives were murdered in Auschwitz.
