= List of ambassadors of Israel to Hungary =

== List of ambassadors ==
- Yacov Hadas-Handelsman, December 2019 – present
- Yossi Amrani 2016 - 2019
- Ilan Mor 2011 - 2016
- Aliza Bin-Noun 2007 - 2011
- David Admon 2004 - 2007
- Judith Varnai-Shorer 2000 - 2004
- Joel Alon 1994 - 2000
- David Kraus 1991 - 1994
- Yudith Hiebner 1983-1987
- Ambassador Slomo Marom 1989 - 1991
- Chargé d'Affaires a.i. David Giladi
- Minister Yerachmiel Ram Yaron 1958 - 1960
- Chargé d'Affaires a.i. Lou-Lea Kaddar
- Chargé d'Affaires a.i. Dov Sattath
- Chargé d'Affaires a.i. Katriel Katz
- Chargé d'Affaires a.i. Avner Gershon
- Minister Meir Touval 1956
- Minister Shmuel Bentzur 1951 - 1952
- Minister Shmoel Elyashiv (Non-Resident, Prague) 1950 - 1951
- Minister Ehud Avriel (Non-Resident, Prague) 1948 - 1950
