= Operation Treblinka =

Historical fabrication devised by Władysław Rażmowski

Operation Treblinka is widely regarded by historians as a historical fabrication devised by Władysław Rażmowski, codenamed Poraj, and certain Polish World War II veterans. It was later popularized by historian Jan Gozdawa-Gołębiowski. This narrative claims that Rażmowski and his Home Army partisan unit played a decisive role in the Jewish prisoner revolt at the Treblinka extermination camp in August 1943.

This account likely emerged in the context of the antisemitic campaign during March 1968 in Poland. For years, Rażmowski's version of events faced little public scrutiny. However, contemporary historians largely dismiss it as unreliable, as it lacks supporting evidence. The real involvement of the Home Army in activities concerning Treblinka and its prisoners remains a matter of debate among scholars.

== Uprising in Treblinka ==
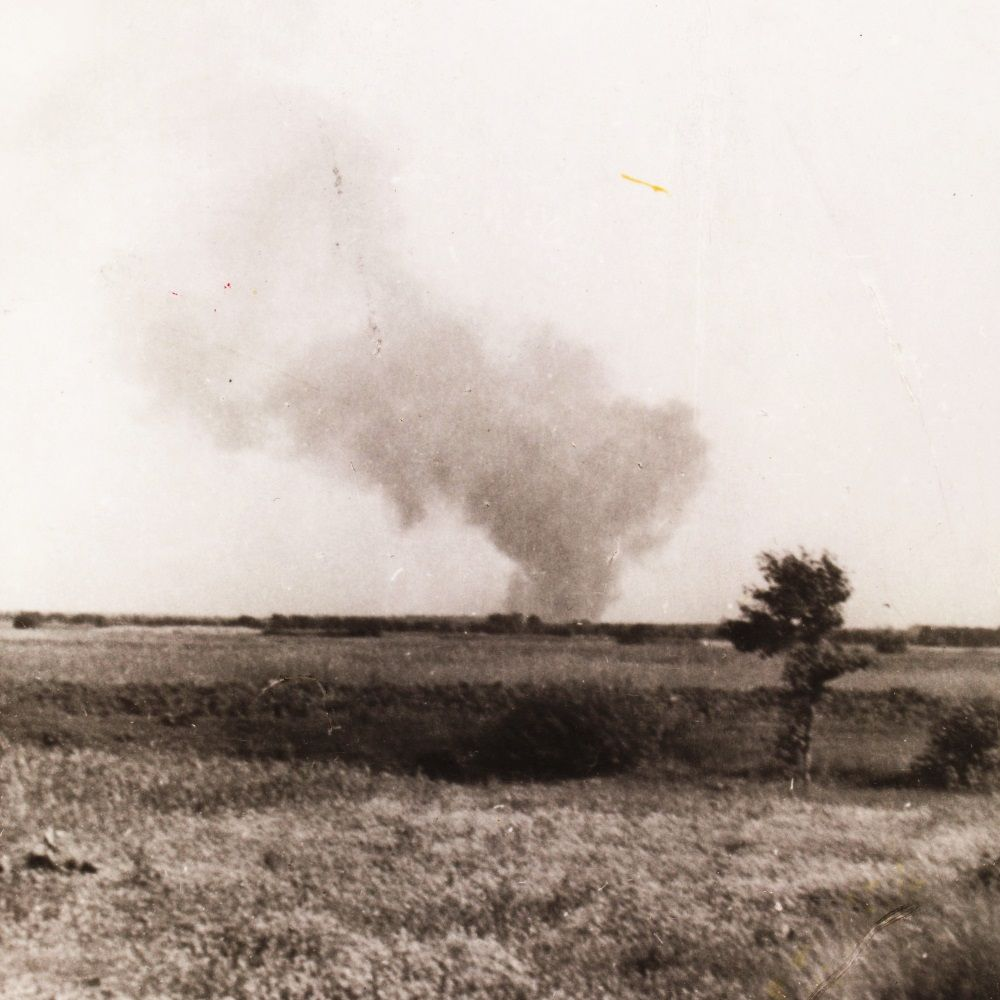
Treblinka camp set on fire by the rebellious prisoners in a photograph by Franciszek Ząbecki

The Treblinka extermination camp, located near the village and railway station of Treblinka in Gmina Kosów Lacki, was established by Nazi German occupiers during World War II. It was one of the three death camps created as part of Operation Reinhard. Using gas chambers, Nazi Germans systematically exterminated Jews brought from ghettos in occupied Poland, including from the Warsaw Ghetto. Jews were also murdered in the camp, who were brought from other countries occupied by the Third Reich. The exact number of victims is unknown. Historians estimate that between 700,000 and 900,000 Jews were killed at Treblinka.

A small number of Jews were separated from the incoming transports, primarily skilled workers and young men, who were then employed in the camp's labor brigades. These prisoners were referred to by the SS as "working Jews" (German: Arbeitsjuden). They performed various tasks for the camp and its staff, and were also forced by the Nazis to directly participate in the extermination process. Their duties included leading victims out of the trains, escorting them to changing rooms, sorting seized clothes and belongings, and cutting the hair of women being led to their deaths. The most tragic position was that of several hundred Jews held in the extermination zone, commonly referred to as the "upper camp" or "camp of the dead" (German: Totenlager, Yiddish: Tojtlager). Their task was to clear and clean the gas chambers, extract gold teeth from the dead victims, bury bodies in mass graves, and later burn the remains. The "working Jews" – ultimately also condemned to death – were exposed to hunger, disease, and the brutality of the guards.

In late February and early March 1943, a group of Treblinka prisoners formed a resistance movement, led by Julian Chorążycki (a doctor from Warsaw and captain in the Polish Armed Forces) and Želomir Bloch (a former Czechoslovak Army officer). After Chorążycki's death, Marceli Galewski, an engineer, took over the leadership. The resistance decided to act as the extermination process at the camp was nearing its end, with the Nazis planning to kill the remaining prisoners. The uprising began on 2 August 1943. The conspirators managed to secretly retrieve weapons from a German storage facility, but due to the premature start of the fight, they were unable to fully surprise the guards and take control of the camp. During the battle and chaotic escape, between 350 and 400 Jews were killed. The resistance managed to injure one German soldier, kill or injure several Trawniki men, and set fire to parts of the camp. Around 400 Jews escaped that day, though only about 70 survived until the end of the occupation.

== Alleged Operation Treblinka ==
=== Testimony of Władysław Rażmowski ===
The alleged Operation Treblinka was first introduced to the public by Władysław Rażmowski, codenamed Poraj – a wartime veteran and former deputy commander of the Home Army's Węgrów District, as well as leader of a partisan unit operating near Treblinka. In 1969, Rażmowski published an account in the journal Dzieje Najnowsze titled Akcja Treblinka (Operation Treblinka).

Rażmowski claimed that the Home Army had prepared an attack on the Treblinka extermination camp. However, before the command could issue orders, in July 1943, Rażmowski was allegedly approached by Kazimierz Grodzicki, a communist and member of the Polish Workers' Party, requesting help in freeing "some of the Warsaw Ghetto insurgents" from the camp. Rażmowski reportedly agreed without informing his superiors and personally reconnoitered the camp's vicinity. According to him, the attack was planned to coincide with a prisoner revolt, which, as he described, was to start at 12:00 PM on August 2.

Poraj allegedly designated three platoons for the attack, each originating from a different district but all operating under his general command. (Note: These units were reportedly commanded by Henryk Oleksiak, codenamed Wichura, Henryk Małkiński, codenamed Kulesza, and Antoni Wróblewski, codenamed Orwid (Rażmowski (1969, pp. 170–171)).) These units reportedly consisted of 52 partisans armed with rifles and machine guns. Rażmowski recounted that they took up positions around 11:00 AM. At about 12:00 PM, he claimed, the camp erupted into "chaotic gunfire and commotion", as a crowd of prisoners ran through the camp gate toward Polish positions. Allegedly, the revolt began when the Germans started leading prisoners to the gas chambers. One Polish subunit was said to have fired on the watchtowers, while members of the other two divided the escapees into smaller groups and assigned them guides. (Note: Wójcik (2018, pp. 240–244) notes that in both of Rażmowski's accounts, the Polish partisans' courageous and decisive actions starkly contrast with the portrayal of Jewish prisoners. According to Rażmowski, the prisoners initially panicked, fleeing chaotically, and later, paralyzed by fear, hid in the woods near the camp. Despite the looming threat of pursuit, they allegedly hesitated to continue their escape.) The camp guards purportedly attempted pursuit but were held back by accurate Polish fire. According to Rażmowski, after nearly an hour of fighting, the partisans withdrew without losses. They later assisted about 200 Jews in escaping and crossing the Bug river.

Rażmowski published another account of Operation Treblinka in 1990, which differed significantly in many details from his original 1969 version. In this later account, he claimed that the uprising in the camp began at 4:00 PM, a time closer to the historical record. He attributed this delay to the supposed fact that the Jewish conspirators were waiting for a group of comrades who had been working outside the camp earlier that day.

Rażmowski further claimed that he personally managed to bring order to the chaos that had gripped the escaping prisoners. He also alleged that, in the final phase of the confrontation, a partisan unit led by Lieutenant Stanisław Siwek, codenamed Śliwa, who had been unaware of the planned action and conducting exercises near the Bug river that day, spontaneously joined the battle. According to Rażmowski, Śliwa and his soldiers assisted Jewish escapees in crossing the river and later engaged in combat with the pursuing German forces. (Note: Rażmowski cited a written account by Siwek as the source of this story. In that account, Siwek claimed that during the fighting, he and several of his subordinates were captured by the Trawniki men from the camp's staff. However, he also stated that all of them managed to escape captivity later that night (Wójcik (2018, p. 245)).)

=== Publications by Jan Gozdawa-Gołębiowski ===
The story fabricated by Rażmowski was popularized by Jan Gozdawa-Gołębiowski, a historian and veteran of the Home Army. In his works, Gozdawa-Gołębiowski relied primarily on Poraj's memoirs but supplemented them with additional elements, at times significantly modifying the account provided by the veteran. Between 1973 and 2002, Gozdawa-Gołębiowski authored at least four texts on the topic, which were published in both academic and non-academic sources, including one in Polish diaspora press.

Gozdawa-Gołębiowski devoted one of the subchapters in his monograph Obszar Warszawski Armii Krajowej (1992) to the alleged Operation Treblinka. In this text, he claimed that as early as late 1942 or early 1943, the commander of the Regional Inspectorate I, Sub-district East of the Warsaw District of the Home Army, Major Bronisław Patlewicz, codenamed Nieczuja, ordered the training of sabotage units tasked with liberating the camp. The Home Army allegedly managed to establish contact with the camp's underground and even smuggled several dozen pistols and four Sten submachine guns into the camp. (Note: The extremely low probability that such events could have occurred, according to Libionka (2007, p. 1089), is indicated by the fact that it would have been a larger amount of weapons than the Home Army supplied to the insurgents of the Warsaw Ghetto.)

A failed attempt to attack the camp reportedly occurred on an unspecified day in April 1943, supposedly without the knowledge of Nieczuja. Second Lieutenant Franciszek Pieniak, codenamed Przebój, was said to have led this action, with a platoon from the Sokołów Podlaski district under the command of Henryk Oleksiak, codenamed Wichura, and a sabotage unit led by Lucjan Gawryś, codenamed Ryś, brought to the Treblinka area. Ultimately, the attack did not take place due to reconnaissance results or, in another version, because German alarms made Przebój conclude the operation was unfeasible. Nonetheless, Wichura's platoon allegedly shelled and threw grenades at the camp gate before retreating. (Note: The account of the attack, as noted by the brother of Wichura – Marian Oleksiak, codenamed Sęp – confirms that such an event took place. However, while Rażmowski and Gozdawa-Gołębiowski framed this event within the broader context of actions by the Home Army to assist the prisoners of Treblinka, Sęp claimed that the attack was solely his brother's initiative from start to finish. His testimony, however, cannot be fully considered reliable. Furthermore, there are no mentions of such an attack in Home Army documents or testimonies from surviving prisoners (Gontarek (2019, pp. 70–73)).) Around this time, Dr. Julian Chorążycki, a leader of the camp's conspiracy, was killed, paralyzing the preparations for the uprising. Thus, Gozdawa-Gołębiowski concluded, "both sides simultaneously called off the action".

In early June 1943, the commander of Sub-district East, Colonel Hieronim Suszczyński, codenamed Szeliga, was said to have submitted a new plan to attack Treblinka to the command of the Warsaw District of the Home Army. This time, the task was reportedly assigned to a partisan unit led by Poraj. Gozdawa-Gołębiowski claimed that the final decision of the district's command is unknown. He then referenced Poraj's account, according to which the attack on Treblinka allegedly resulted from an independent decision by Poraj, influenced by the pleas of the communist Kazimierz Grodzicki. He also repeated the story of establishing contact with the camp's underground through a Jew who, after losing his family, voluntarily reported to the camp. Attempting to shield Poraj from accusations of complete insubordination, the historian argued that the decision to attack was not entirely contrary to the Home Army's preparations for the operation.

On 2 August, around 11:00 AM, three Home Army units under the overall command of Poraj, numbering 52 partisans in total, were said to have discreetly positioned themselves near the camp. The escape was scheduled for 12:00 PM, but the camp remained calm for several hours. Only around 4:00 PM did a violent shootout break out in the administrative section. It was reportedly discovered that Grodzicki's planned escape and the presence of Poraj's unit coincided with a revolt by Jewish prisoners. The conspiracy leaders – unaware of the Poles' plans – had supposedly accidentally chosen the same day for the uprising. Thus, a "fortunate coincidence" was said to have "saved the lives of hundreds of people". The rest of Gozdawa-Gołębiowski's account aligns with Poraj's narrative. Polish partisans allegedly engaged the surprised Germans and enabled hundreds of Jews to escape. The same text also mentions the accidental involvement of Lieutenant Śliwa's unit and the assistance his soldiers provided to Jews crossing the Bug river.

While Rażmowski described the alleged Operation Treblinka as a success, Gozdawa-Gołębiowski concluded that it was a failure, as the Polish partisans and Jewish insurgents were unable to destroy the camp or liberate all the prisoners.

=== References in other publications ===
In 1977, Franciszek Ząbecki's memoirs Wspomnienia dawne i nowe were published by the Pax Publishing House. Ząbecki, who was a member of the Home Army and worked as a dispatcher at the Treblinka station during the war, did not mention the alleged attack by Polish partisans on the extermination camp. He only stated that such an action was considered and that he was tasked with preparing a plan of the camp. However, this project was eventually abandoned for unknown reasons. Ząbecki confirmed that on 2 August 1943, Lieutenant Śliwa's unit assisted a group of escapees in crossing the Bug river.

In Najtrudniejszy front. Krótki zarys historii ruchu oporu w systemie hitlerowskich obozów koncentracyjnych (1978), Zygmunt Zonik referred to Gozdawa-Gołębiowski's articles about the alleged Operation Treblinka. However, he primarily did so to argue against Jean-François Steiner's claims about the number of Jews who survived the escape from Treblinka. Zonik did not take a clear stance on Gozdawa-Gołębiowski's findings regarding the alleged smuggling of weapons into the camp and the proposal to provide "fire cover" for the prisoners' planned escape, merely commenting that "the accounts suggest that the plan was only partially carried out".

In 1993, Stanisława Lewandowska mentioned the involvement of Polish partisans in the revolt at Treblinka in her article Powstania zbrojne w obozach zagłady w Treblince i Sobiborze. However, in another part of her work, she stated that the "negative – so far – results of the inquiry" did not allow confirmation that such events actually took place. (Note: Nevertheless, the author considered Gozdawa-Gołębiowski's articles on this matter to be "extremely interesting and convincing in their evidential layer" (Lewandowska (1993, p. 124)).)

It took many years before the story of the alleged Operation Treblinka was definitively challenged by the Polish scientific community. In 2007, Dariusz Libionka critically addressed the issue in a chapter of his book Prowincja noc. Życie i zagłada Żydów w dystrykcie warszawskim. The history of this falsification was later brought to a wider audience by Michał Wójcik in his 2018 book Treblinka '43. Bunt w fabryce śmierci.

=== Origins of forgery ===
The reason why a group of veterans and historians decided to fabricate the story of the involvement of the Home Army in the Treblinka uprising is not entirely clear. Michał Wójcik points out that Rażmowski's account was first published in 1969, a year after the March 1968 events, which sparked an international debate about Polish antisemitism and Polish attitudes towards Jews during World War II. He speculates that the goal of the authors of the fabrication was a "defense of the good name of Poland and the Polish people".

Dariusz Libionka argues that "Polish accounts of involvement in Treblinka appeared not by chance and were meant to serve a specific propaganda role". Alicja Gontarek links the publication of Rażmowski's account in Dzieje Najnowsze with a propaganda campaign launched by the communist authorities after the March events. This campaign aimed to exaggerate the assistance provided to Jews by Poles during World War II. Gontarek identifies the alleged collaboration with the Polish Workers' Party, which appears in Rażmowski's account and in later publications by Gozdawa-Gołębiowski, as a "sign of the times" in Polish People's Republic propaganda.

== Home Army and the uprising of Treblinka prisoners ==
Both the Polish and Jewish resistance movements had relatively extensive knowledge of the Treblinka extermination camp, including its topography, security measures, prisoners, incoming transports, and methods of extermination. Additionally, it is certain that on 27 January 1943, the commander of the Warsaw District of the Home Army received an order from the chief commander, General Stefan Rowecki, codenamed Grot, to "reconnoiter the camps in Treblinka and send recommendations regarding the possibility of attacking the camp and plans for organizing such an action". However, no results of this reconnaissance or conclusions regarding the feasibility of an attack on the death camp and its neighboring labor camp have been found in the archives.

Survivor testimonies and memoirs do not mention any involvement of the Polish resistance in the uprising at Treblinka. This includes the earliest of these accounts, by Jankiel Wiernik, which was published by the Polish underground even before the end of the occupation. Likewise, no documents from the Home Army confirm that they maintained contact with the camp's underground resistance or conducted an attack on the camp. The Polish underground press, which published articles on the uprising in Treblinka in the second half of 1943, does not contain any information about Polish participation in this rebellion. The alleged Operation Treblinka was also not mentioned by General Tadeusz Komorowski, codenamed Bór, in his telegram to the Polish government-in-exile dated 5 August 1943, which discussed the possibility of aiding Jews through Polish underground efforts. Nor does a report by Henryk Woliński, codenamed Wacław, from late 1944/1945, which attempted to summarize the actions the Home Army took to save Jewish lives.

There are no references to such an attack in the investigation files regarding the crimes committed at the camp, conducted by the Main Commission for the Investigation of Nazi Crimes in the autumn of 1945. German sources also remain silent on the matter, as do testimonies from the inhabitants of the Treblinka area, collected and published by Ryszard Czarkowski in his 1989 book Cieniom Treblinki.

There is a lack of evidence to support the claims made by Stanisław Siwek that his unit helped a large group of Jews cross the Bug river on 2 August 1943. Teresa Prekerowa suggests that local fishermen may have occasionally provided such assistance, but for a fee.

Dariusz Libionka, after analyzing available underground documents, concluded that the Home Army intelligence and command were surprised by the successful revolt of Treblinka prisoners. Moreover, the arrival of armed escapees in eastern Mazovia caused some concern. Jan Grabowski argues that the actions of the Polish resistance, including both local conspirators and the central Polish Underground State, treated the extermination of Jews as a "secondary issue", viewing the appearance of many Jewish escapees as primarily a problem to be dealt with. However, Alicja Gontarek criticizes this view, accusing Grabowski and Libionka of superficial research and selective quoting of sources.

Libionka finds the accounts of Polish veterans regarding contacts between the camp underground and the Polish resistance, as well as their preparations for an attack on the camp, to be unreliable and often contradictory. He does not entirely rule out that certain contacts might have been made by Franciszek Ząbecki but asserts that it is impossible for the Polish resistance to have proposed an uprising in the camp. Furthermore, Libionka dismisses the claims about smuggling weapons into the camp and the involvement of Polish partisans in battles around Treblinka as "pure fantasy". Grabowski similarly dismisses these claims, stating they were "made up out of thin air" and were a "common fabrication". Michał Wójcik goes even further, calling Rażmowski's account "outright lies".

Alicja Gontarek, on the other hand, acknowledges the lack of references in Jewish accounts, underground press, and Home Army documents about Polish military aid to Treblinka. She also considers Poraj's account to be unreliable and full of fabrications. However, Gontarek argues that there is evidence suggesting the participation of the Home Army, specifically Kedyw (the combat branch of the Home Army), in the uprising. She points to two documents: one is a June 1943 report by the Kedyw commander in the Eastern Sub-district, Adam Kompowski, detailing plans of sabotage and diversion activities "for the coming months", which included the elimination of "camp for Jews No. 2 in Treblinka". The second is an August 1943 report from the Kedyw of the Home Army General Headquarters, which mentions an attack on a guard post at an unnamed "Jewish camp" – likely Treblinka II, according to Gontarek. (Note: According to Alicja Gontarek, the August attack on the camp was orchestrated by Kedyw of the General Headquarters of the Home Army, with conspirators from the Sokołów and Węgrów counties playing at most a limited role. Moreover, she believes that this attack must have been coordinated with the prisoners' uprising in Treblinka. However, she emphasizes that "the participation of Home Army soldiers in the revolt was limited to a supporting role" (Gontarek (2019, p. 87)).) However, she stresses that further research is needed on this matter.

== Bibliography ==
- Arad, Yitzhak (1999). Belzec, Sobibor, Treblinka. The Operation Reinhard Death Camps. Bloomington and Indianapolis: Indiana University Press. ISBN 978-0-253-21305-1.
- Gontarek, Alicja (2019). "Akcja zbrojna Armii Krajowej w czasie buntu w obozie Treblinka II w sierpniu 1943 roku – rekonesans badawczy" [Armed Action of the Home Army During the Revolt at the Treblinka II Camp in August 1943 – Research Reconnaissance] (PDF). Studia nad Totalitaryzmami i Wiekiem XX (in Polish). 3. Warsaw: Instytut Solidarności i Męstwa im. Witolda Pileckiego. ISSN 2545-241X.
- Gozdawa-Gołębiowski, Jan (1992). Obszar Warszawski Armii Krajowej [Warsaw District of the Home Army] (in Polish). Lublin: Redakcja Wydawnictw Katolickiego Uniwersytetu Lubelskiego. ISBN 83-228-0136-X.
- Grabowski, Jan (2018). "Powiat węgrowski" [Węgrów County]. In Engelking, Barbara; Grabowski, Jan (eds.). Dalej jest noc. Losy Żydów w wybranych powiatach okupowanej Polski [The Night Continues. The Fate of Jews in Selected Counties of Occupied Poland] (in Polish). Warsaw: Stowarzyszenie Centrum Badań nad Zagładą Żydów. ISBN 978-83-63444-62-4.
- Lewandowska, Stanisława (1993). "Powstanie zbrojne w obozach zagłady w Treblince i Sobiborze" [Armed Uprisings in the Extermination Camps of Treblinka and Sobibor]. Biuletyn Głównej Komisji Badania Zbrodni przeciwko Narodowi Polskiemu Instytutu Pamięci Narodowej (in Polish). XXXV. Warsaw. ISSN 0867-8375.
- Libionka, Dariusz (2007). "Polska konspiracja wobec eksterminacji Żydów w dystrykcie warszawskim" [Province of Night. Life and Extermination of Jews in the Warsaw District]. In Engelking, Barbara; Leociak, Jacek; Libionka, Dariusz (eds.). Prowincja noc. Życie i zagłada Żydów w dystrykcie warszawskim [Warsaw District of the Home Army] (in Polish). Warsaw: Centrum Badań nad Zagładą Żydów. ISBN 978-83-63444-03-7.
- Młynarczyk, Jacek Andrzej (2013). "Niemiecki obóz zagłady dla ludności żydowskiej w Treblince" [German Extermination Camp for the Jewish Population in Treblinka]. In Kopówka, Edward (ed.). Co wiemy o Treblince? Stan badań [What Do We Know About Treblinka? The State of Research] (in Polish). Siedlce: Muzeum Regionalne w Siedlcach. ISBN 978-83-88761-38-6.
- Rażmowski, Władysław (1969). "Akcja Treblinka" [Operation Treblinka]. Dzieje Najnowsze (in Polish). 1 (1). Warsaw: Instytut Historii Polskiej Akademii Nauk. ISSN 0419-8824.
- Wójcik, Michał (2018). Treblinka '43. Bunt w fabryce śmierci [Treblinka '43. Uprising in the Death Factory] (in Polish). Kraków: Znak. ISBN 978-83-240-4817-5.
- Ząbecki, Franciszek (1977). Wspomnienia dawne i nowe [Old and New Memories] (in Polish). Warsaw: Pax.
