= Issacharoff =

Issacharoff is a surname. Notable people with the surname include:

- Avi Issacharoff (born 1973), Israeli journalist known for his focus on Palestinian affairs
- Jeremy Issacharoff (born 1955), Israeli diplomat
- Samuel Issacharoff (born 1954), American law professor
