= Julian Chorążycki =

Polish Army doctor-in-chief (1885–1943)

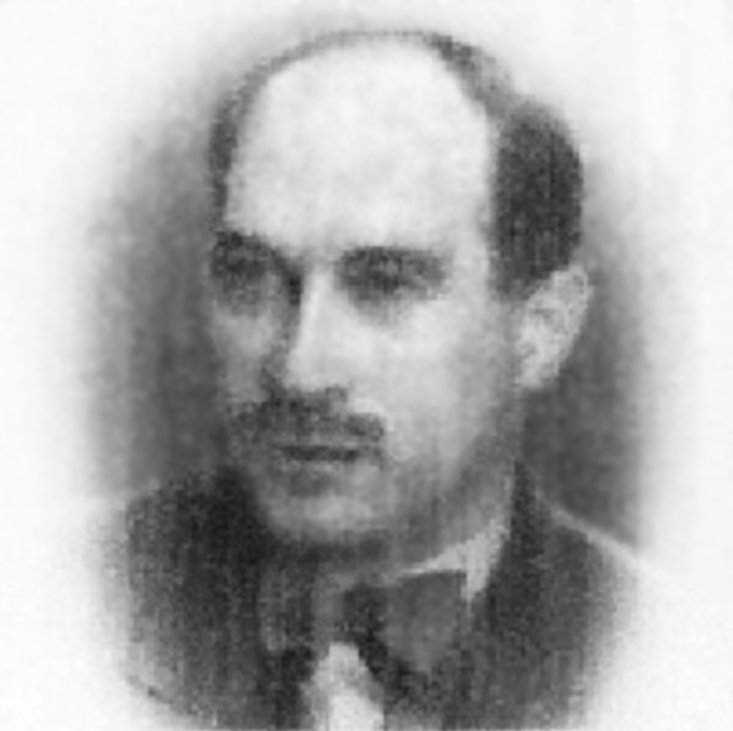
- Julian Chorążycki (c. 1940)
- Born: August 19, 1885; Šiauliai, Kovno Governorate, Russian Empire
- Died: April 19, 1943 (aged 57); Treblinka extermination camp, German-occupied Poland
- Occupation: Medical doctor
- Known for: Holocaust resistance

Julian Chorążycki (August 19, 1885 – April 19, 1943) served as doctor-in-chief of the infantry regiment in the Polish Army during the reconstitution of sovereign Poland. In the interwar period, he was a throat surgeon practising in Warsaw. Born Jewish, Chorążycki spent two years in the Warsaw Ghetto. During the Holocaust in Poland he became the first leader of the perilous prisoner uprising at the Treblinka extermination camp. On August 2, 1943 – after the long period of preparation posing an immediate threat to life – an armed revolt in Treblinka erupted, however, Chorążycki killed himself on April 19, 1943, when faced with imminent capture, to avoid revealing details of the uprising and its participants under torture.

== Life ==
Julian Chorążycki was born to a Jewish family in Szawle (now Šiauliai) in the Russian Empire. He converted to Catholicism as an adult. His family settled in Warsaw when he was a child. After high school, Julian went to Munich to study medicine at the Ludwig-Maximilians-Universität München and obtained his degree in 1910. Shortly after, he returned to Warsaw and in 1911 passed the state exams to practice Otorhinolaryngology. After the outbreak of World War I in 1914, he was taken to the Russian Army as the regimental physician. In 1918, he returned to Poland, and in March 1919 was appointed to the Polish Army as a chief physician during the Polish-Bolshevik war. He commanded a field hospital in the rank of Captain.

In May 1922, Chorążycki was demobilised and joined the 1st District Hospital in Warsaw. He married Rozalia Lewenfisz and ran a private medical practice. They moved to Nowogrodzka 31 Street in the 1930s. He worked in the outpatient clinic for Social Insurance on top of his own practice. Chorążycki was mobilized again after the Nazi-Soviet invasion of Poland. At the end of 1940, he moved to the Warsaw Ghetto where he continued his medical practice. From the ghetto he was taken to the extermination camp in Treblinka in the summer or fall of 1942, during the genocidal Operation Reinhard.

=== Treblinka extermination camp ===
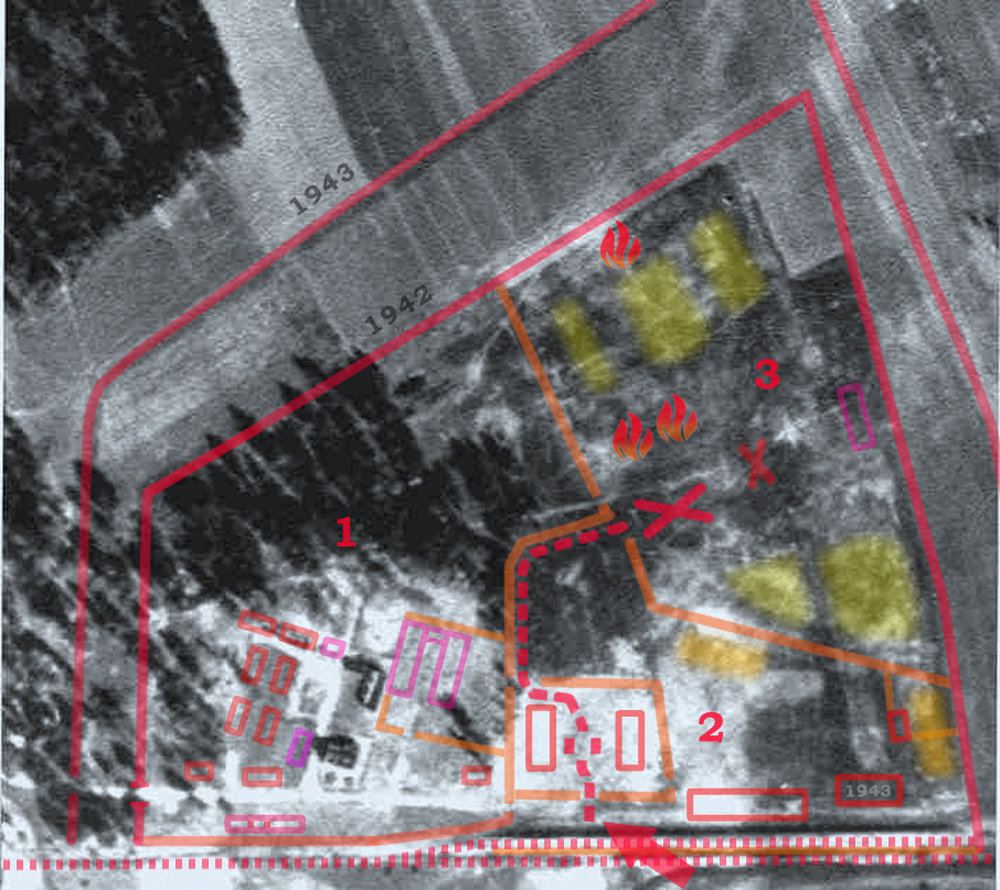
The 1944 aerial photo of Treblinka II after 'closing'. The photograph is overlaid with already dismantled structures including German 'armoury' in the lower-left from the unloading platform (centre, marked with an arrow)

At Treblinka, Chorążycki was put in charge of a small infirmary for the SS (not to be mistaken with the fake infirmary called "lazaret" where the hands-on killing took place). He was a noble man, essential to taking action, wrote Samuel Rajzman. His Organizing Committee at the Treblinka Totenlager included Zelomir Bloch (leadership), Rudolf Masaryk, Marceli Galewski, Samuel Rajzman, Dr. Irena Lewkowska (sick bay), Leon Haberman, and several others. Chorążycki collected a large lump-sum of hard cash from the Goldjuden commando with the intention of bribing a Trawniki guard he thought he had befriended. Instead, he was ambushed at work with the money by Untersturmführer Franz and swallowed a deadly poison before he could be arrested. Chorążycki was replaced in the Underground by Dr. Berek Lajcher from Wegrów (also a former Polish Army officer, who arrived at Treblinka on May 1). Lajcher (improperly, Lecher) launched the uprising on a hot summer day when a group of Germans and Ukrainians drove off to the Bug river for a swim.

=== The uprising ===
On August 2 (Monday, a day of rest from gassing), the door to the arsenal near the train tracks was silently unlocked by the Jews and some 20–25 rifles, 20 hand grenades, and several pistols were stolen and delivered in a cart to the gravel work-detail. At 3:45 p.m. some 700 Jewish prisoners launched the attack on the gates. They sprayed gasoline on all the buildings and set them ablaze. Several buildings were blown up. However, the machine gun fire from the well-trained Germans (some 25 of them) and Ukrainian Trawnikis (numbering around 60) resulted in near slaughter. Most prisoners perished. Only 150–200 Jews succeeded in crossing over to the other side. Half of those were killed after a chase. Some of those who escaped successfully were transported across the river by the partisans of the Armia Krajowa hiding in the surrounding forest. Only approximately 70 Jews are known to have survived until the end of the war, including future authors of published Treblinka memoirs: Jankiel Wiernik, Chil Rajchman, Richard Glazar, and Samuel Willenberg. There was also a revolt at Sobibor two months later.
