= Yacov Hadas-Handelsman =

Israeli diplomat

- יעקב הדס-הנדלסמן
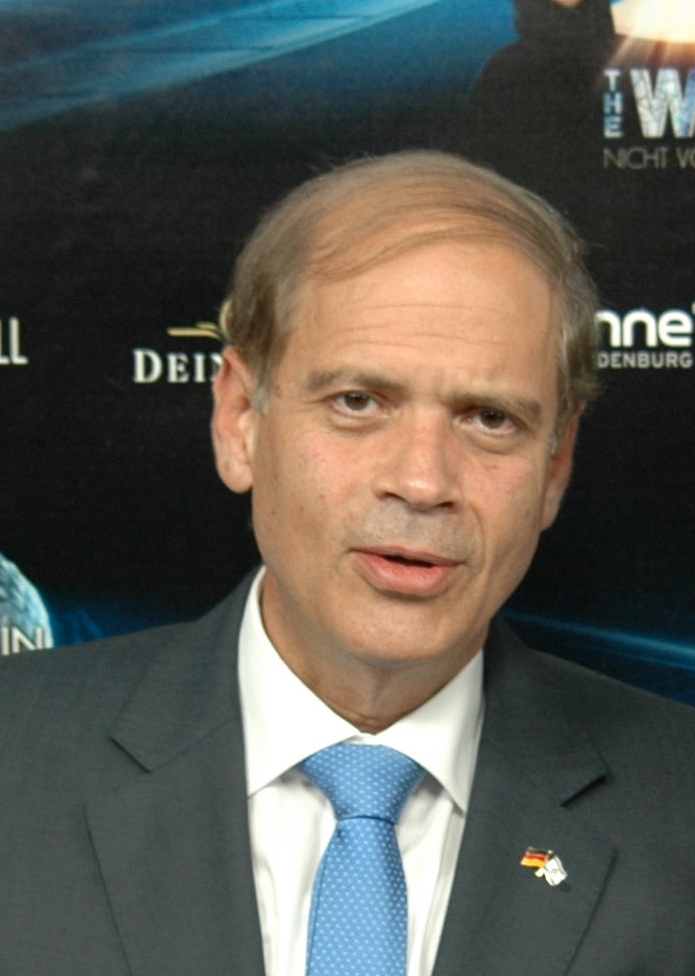
- Handelsman in 2014

Israeli Ambassador to Germany
- In office 2012–2017
- Preceded by: Yoram Ben-Zeev
- Succeeded by: Jeremy Issacharoff

Israeli Ambassador to Hungary
- Incumbent
- Assumed office 2019
- Preceded by: Yossi Amrani

Personal details
- Born: August 22, 1957 (age 69) Tel Aviv, Israel
- Education: Hebrew University

Yacov Hadas-Handelsman (Hebrew: יעקב הדס-הנדלסמן; born August 22, 1957, in Tel Aviv) is the Israeli Ambassador to Hungary. From 2012 to 2017 he was the Israeli ambassador to Germany, based at the Embassy of Israel, Berlin.

He earned a BA in Middle East and political science studies from Tel Aviv University and an MA in Middle East studies from Hebrew University.
