= List of ambassadors of Israel to Germany =

This is a list of Israel's ambassadors to Germany. The ambassador is based in Berlin, the German capital. The current ambassador is Ron Prosor, who has held his position since 2021. The first ambassador was Asher Ben-Natan, who served from 1965 to 1970.

- Asher Ben-Natan (1965–1970)
- Eliashiv Ben-Horin (1970–1974)
- Yohanan Meroz (1974–1981)
- Yitzhak Ben-Ari (1981–1988)
- Benjamin Navon (1988–1993)
- Avi Primor (1993–1999)
- Vacant (1999–2001)
- Shimon Stein (2001–2007)
- Yoram Ben-Zeev (2007–2011)
- Yacov Hadas-Handelsman (2012–2017)
- Jeremy Issacharoff (2017–2021)
- Ron Prosor (2022–)

== See also ==
- Germany–Israel relations
