= Kalman Taigman =

Israeli-Polish Holocaust survivor

- Born: c. 24 December 1923; Warsaw, Poland
- Died: c. 27 July 2012 (aged 88); Tel-Aviv, Israel
- Known for: Treblinka survivor
- Spouse(s): Rina Taigman (1st wife, until 1986), Lea Lipshitz (2nd wife)
- Children: Haim Taigman (son)
- Parent(s): Shimon Taigman (father), Tema Taigman (mother)

Kalman Taigman also Teigman Hebrew: קלמן טייגמן (c. 24 December 1923 – c. 27 July 2012) was an Israeli citizen who was born and grew up in Warsaw, Poland. One of the former members of the Jewish Sonderkommando who escaped from the Treblinka extermination camp during the prisoner uprising of August 1943, Taigman later testified at the 1961 Eichmann Trial held in Jerusalem.

After his escape and emigration from Poland, Taigman did not return to the country for more than 60 years. He returned to Treblinka for the first time in 2010 (two years before his death), asked by film director Tzipi Beider to take part in a documentary, along with another Treblinka revolt survivor and friend of his, Samuel Willenberg. Taigman's second wife of 26 years, Lea Lipshitz, who went along with them, said that Taigman was happy to be in Poland once more and much to her surprise spoke Polish again with ease.

== Biography ==
Kalman Teigman (Taigman) studied at a technical school in Warsaw, where he was taught by Adam Czerniaków among others. In 1935, his father emigrated to Mandate Palestine intending to arrange for the family to join him, but the war broke out and he was unable to achieve that. After the Nazis invaded Poland and began to set up ghettos in major cities, the young Kalman and his mother were trapped in the Warsaw Ghetto. It was the largest Jewish ghetto in all of Nazi Germany-occupied Europe, eventually holding 500,000 inmates.

They worked for the ghetto branch of Germany's Chemnitzer Astrawerke AG factory. In 1942, both of them were deported to Treblinka during the Grossaktion Warsaw.

The extermination camp near Treblinka was built as part of the Nazis' Operation Reinhard (the most deadly phase of the "Final Solution"). It operated between 23 July 1942 and 19 October 1943 officially. During this time, more than 800,000 Jews – men, women, and children – were murdered there, gassed upon arrival.

Kalman's mother was sent directly from the Holocaust train to the gas chambers, which were disguised as showers. Kalman was put to work with the Sonderkommando in the Auffanglager sorting barracks. Of his experience at Treblinka, Taigman said on film: "It was hell, absolutely hell. A normal man cannot imagine how a living person could have lived through it – killers, natural-born killers, who without a trace of remorse just murdered every little thing."

He described how the Germans had designed the camp to conceal its true purpose:

There were flowers planted on the ground, and of course people couldn't imagine where they were. They [the SS] painted the huts and put up all sorts of signs as if it was a real railway station. I remember that once one of them said these words – I'll never forget these words – he said it in German, "Come quickly because the water is getting cold!" That's how far they went. The manner in which it worked was macabre, and it was a horrible thing to see.

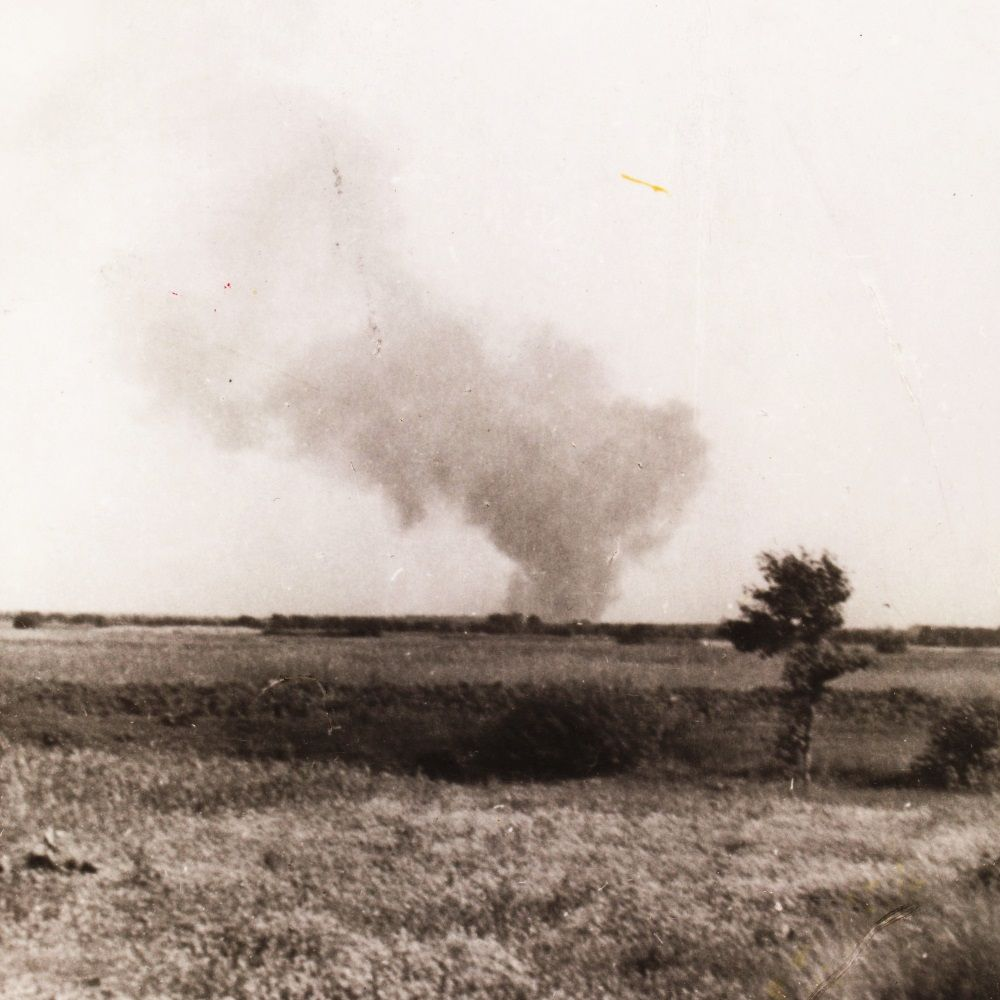
From Taigman's deposition: burning Treblinka II perimeter during the prisoner uprising of 2 August 1943. Barracks were set ablaze, including a tank of petrol which exploded and spread flames to all other structures. A clandestine photograph taken by eyewitness Franciszek Ząbecki.

The Sonderkommando had planned the revolt for a long time, accumulating weapons and following the schedules of the SS officers. They planned to kill the SS officers first and then lead the prisoners out the gates, but plans went awry after a few officers were killed, and chaos ensued.

Taigman escaped during the uprising of 2 August 1943 by climbing over the barbed-wire fence under machine-gun fire by the guards. He reached Warsaw after weeks.

Soon after the war ended, he married in Warsaw. A year later Taigman joined his father in Mandate Palestine. In trying to reach the territory, he was first arrested by the British and transferred to a Jewish refugee camp set up in Cyprus.

Taigman became a businessman in Israel, where he developed a successful import business. For a number of years in Israel, Taigman used to meet with other Holocaust survivors on the anniversary of the Treblinka uprising. Among the guests at the home of his friends Samuel (Szmuel) Willenberg and his wife Ada were Pinhas (Pinchas) Epstein and Eliahu Rosenberg. Together with Taigman, they testified at the 1961 trial of Holocaust perpetrator Adolf Eichmann in Jerusalem.

Later both Rosenberg and Epstein were star witnesses for the Israeli prosecution at the 1986–88 trial in Israel of John Demjanjuk, who had been living in the United States since 1952. He was identified as a Trawniki camp guard, who drawn from Soviet POWs held by the Germans, who had been nicknamed "Ivan the Terrible" by Treblinka prisoners. A guard at the gas chamber, "Ivan" was accused of committing murder and acts of extraordinary cruelty and violence at Treblinka against the Jewish prisoners in 1942–43.

But when asked, Taigman refused to testify against him. He said that Demjanjuk had not worked as a guard at Treblinka. He was convicted but appealed the verdict, saying he had never worked at Treblinka. While the case was under appeal, the Soviet Union fell and it opened many of its archives to researchers. Investigators discovered in those Soviet-held archives that Demjanjuk appeared to have served at Sobibor SS death camp, according to an ID with his photo. Rosenberg and Epstein had identified Demjanjuk as "Ivan" from photographs that were decades old. To make matters worse, Rosenberg's testimony in his case from 1981 was shown to have been coached by the interrogators and wholly illegitimate.

Kalman Taigman died in 2012 of a brain tumor, survived by his second wife Lea, a son, and two grandchildren.

== Legacy and honors ==
- Taigman was featured in two documentary films: Despite Treblinka (2002), a Uruguayan documentary in which he was featured along with Treblinka revolt survivor Chil Rajchman of Montevideo.
- He and his friend Samuel Willenberg were featured in BBC Four's Death Camp Treblinka: Survivors Stories (2012), aired also in the US that year as Treblinka's Last Witness.
