= Judith Varnai-Shorer =

Israeli diplomat

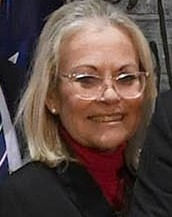
Judith Varnai Shorer, January 2018

Judith Varnai-Shorer (Hebrew: יהודית ורנאי-שורר) is a retired Israeli diplomat who was the consul to Atlanta, Georgia from 2015 until 2019 and Ambassador to Hungary and Bosnia-Herzegovina from 2000 until 2004.

The Israeli Consulates in the United States were being restructured during her tenure (for example, the office in Philadelphia was closed). She worked to keep the consulates open, in part due to anti-Semitism. Varnai-Shorer's parents were Holocaust survivors from Hungary and her paternal grandfather changed their name from Weiss before World War I because of the anti-Semitism.
