= Avi Primor =

Israeli diplomat and publicist

- אבי פרימור
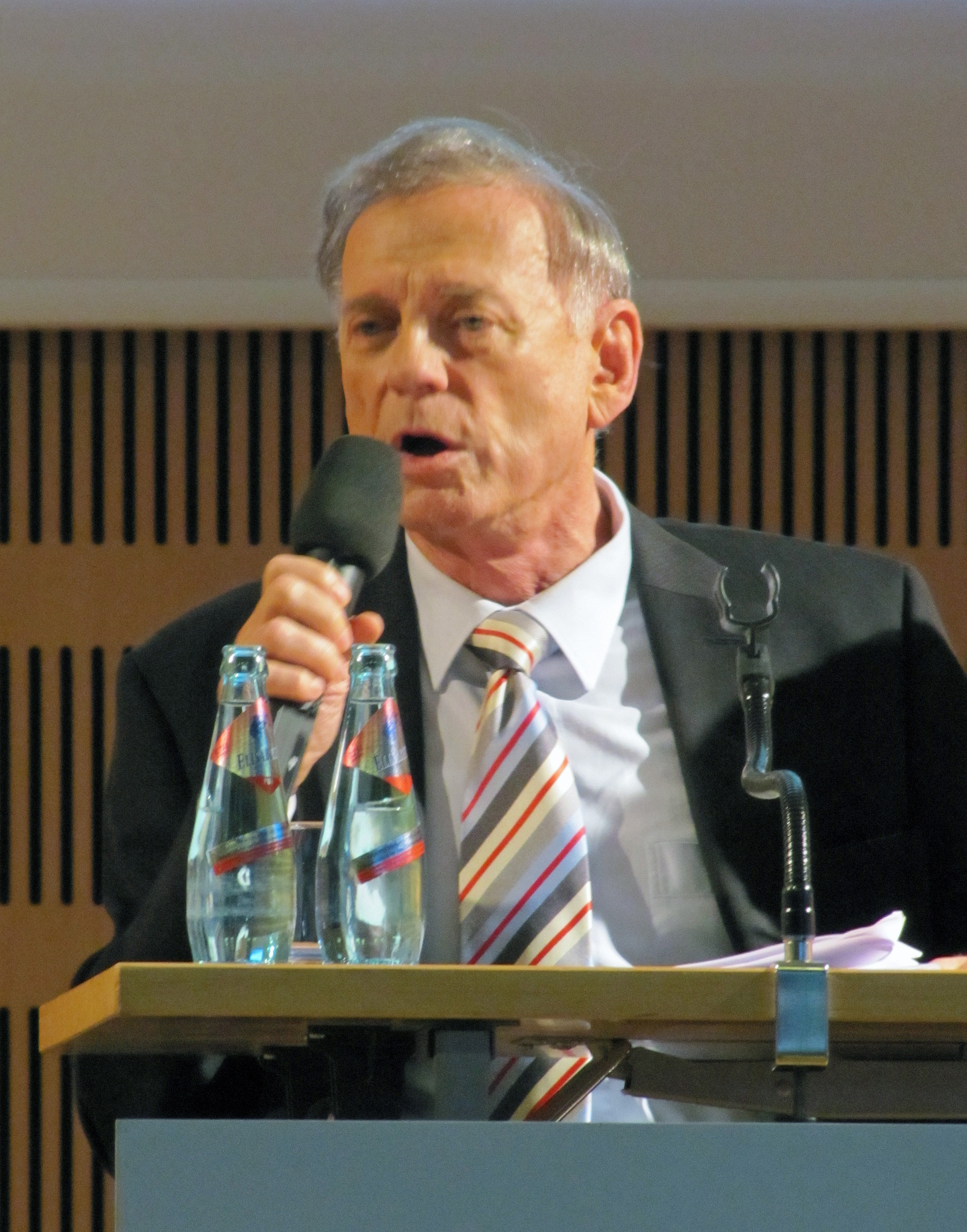
- Primor in 2010 at Frankfurt am Main

Israeli Ambassador to Germany
- In office 1993–1999
- Preceded by: Benjamin Navon
- Succeeded by: Shimon Stein

Israeli Ambassador to the European Union
- In office 1987–1993
- Preceded by: Yitzhak Minerbi
- Succeeded by: Harry Kney-Tal

Personal details
- Born: April 8, 1935 (age 91) Tel Aviv, Israel
- Awards: Bundesverdienstkreuz

Avraham "Avi" Primor (Hebrew: אבי פרימור; born 8 April 1935 in Tel Aviv) is an Israeli publicist and former diplomat. From 1987 to 1993, he served as Ambassador to the European Union, and from 1993 to 1999 as Ambassador to Germany. After leaving the diplomatic service, he was vice-president of the University of Tel Aviv until 2004. While Ambassador to Germany, Primor rose to national prominence as one of the most important promoters of the German-Israeli dialogue. He has been awarded the Mérite européen award for his contribution to European unification, as well as the Grand Cross with Star and Sash of the Order of Merit of the Federal Republic of Germany.

Since 2010, Avi Primor has served president of the Israel Council on Foreign Relations, an independent, non-partisan think tank for the study and debate of foreign policy questions, especially those relating to the Israel and the Jewish people.

Primor has published a number of articles on Israel, the Middle East, Iran and Israeli-German relations in newspapers and magazines, including Süddeutsche Zeitung (Germany), and he is also regularly interviewed as an expert on these issues on radio and television, notably in Germany.

== Views on Israeli-Palestinian peace process ==
At an international workshop on global security held in Rome in 2010, Avi Primor said regarding the prospects for peace between Israelis and Palestinians:

"We do not implement a peace plan because the majority of Israelis believe that the one and only issue that truly interests them, which is the issue of security, has not been resolved in any of the peace propositions that have been published. When we negotiated with Egypt and with Jordan, we knew that those partners, if willing, were capable of guaranteeing us security. We do not think that our Palestinian partner, although he is willing, is capable of guaranteeing us security. We fear that if we leave the West Bank under the present conditions, even within the framework of a peace agreement, that the situation in the West Bank will develop as it did in the evacuated Gaza Strip. If we do not find a solution that convinces Israelis that leaving the West Bank will guarantee their security, then there will be no public opinion to support or put pressure on the Israeli government to accept a peace agreement. I think that the solution only can come from the international community."

== Publications ==
- "No Permanent Allies, No Permanent Enemies, Only Permanent Interests: Israeli-Iranian Relations", Israel Journal of Foreign Affairs VIII : 1 (2014) pp 33–38.
