= Ferenc Szaniszló =

Hungarian broadcaster

- Born: Csenger
- Occupation: Journalist

Ferenc Szaniszló (born 7 October 1960) is a Hungarian right-wing media figure, and a former broadcaster for Echo TV, a conservative television service in Hungary. In 2013 Szaniszló received the Táncsics Journalism Award for his earlier work, including reports on the fall of the Soviet Union and the Yugoslav Wars, but returned it following criticism over antisemitic and anti-Roma remarks broadcast nationally on Echo TV.

== Career ==
Szaniszló was born in Csenger in 1960, and grew up in Csegöld and Fehérgyarmat, both in east Hungary. He attended university in Moscow, and was subsequently stationed there as an employee of the Hungarian daily paper Magyar Hírlap.

Working for Budapest television, Szaniszló reported on the collapse of the Soviet Union, and on the conflict between Serb and Hungarian speaking populations in Yugoslavia. Later, Szaniszló covered the Kosovo war in Serbia, interviewing Albanian villagers and political leaders.

In Hungary, Szaniszló worked as an editor for Duna TV news between 2005–2007. Since 2008 he has worked for the television chain Echo TV, a "favorite forum among Hungarian neofascists" according to Le Monde. Following the Ajka alumina plant accident in October 2010, Szaniszló claimed that the incident was caused by the International Monetary Fund, and bombing by the North Atlantic Treaty Organization.

== Returned Táncsics award ==
On 14 March 2013 the Hungarian Human Resources Minister Zoltán Balog awarded Szaniszló the Táncsics award, Hungary's highest state award for journalism, named after Mihály Táncsics. A dozen former recipients of the Táncsics returned their awards in protest, due to Szaniszló's history of controversy including a 2011 incident which resulted in a government fine over, according to The Independent, "anti-Semitic outbursts and his detrimental remarks about the country’s ostracised Roma minority," including calling Roma "human monkeys" and suggesting he regarded Jews as garbage.

Szaniszló's receipt of the award was criticized by Hungarian and international media, by the Israeli ambassador Ilan Mor, and by U.S. ambassador Eleni Tsakopoulos Kounalakis. Conversely, Jobbik Party president Gábor Vona stated that Szaniszló had won a "moral victory" in an interview with Hungary's Szent Korona Rádió (Holy Crown Radio).

Balog responded with an open letter to Szaniszló stating:

I primarily intended to acknowledge the work you once did as a foreign affairs correspondent reporting from the former Soviet area and the war in the Balkans ... Only after I made the decision about the award was I informed about your assertions in the past few years, which I cannot identify with as they go against the values that I and the government represent.

Szaniszló later agreed to return the award. He denied the charge of racism and stated that he was "a victim of machinations by Israel and the United States", adding, "I exposed the truth about September 11, about the Kennedy murder, about Diana’s murder, and that pains them."

== See also ==
- Romani people in Hungary
