= List of ambassadors of Israel to the European Union =

== List of ambassadors ==
- Haim Regev 2021–present
- Aharon Leshno-Yaar 2016–2021
- David Walzer 2012–2016
- Yacov Hadas-Handelsman 2011–2012
- Ran Curiel 2007–2011
- Oded Eran 2002–2007
- Harry Kney-Tal 1999–2002

=== Former ambassadors - European Economic Community ===
- Yitzhak Minerbi 1978–1983
- Eliashiv Ben-Horin 1974–1978
- Moshe Alon 1969–1974
- Amiel E. Najar 1960–1968
- Gideon Rafael 1957–1960
