= Ron Prosor =

Israeli diplomat (born 1958)

His Excellency Ron Prosor
- רון פרושאור
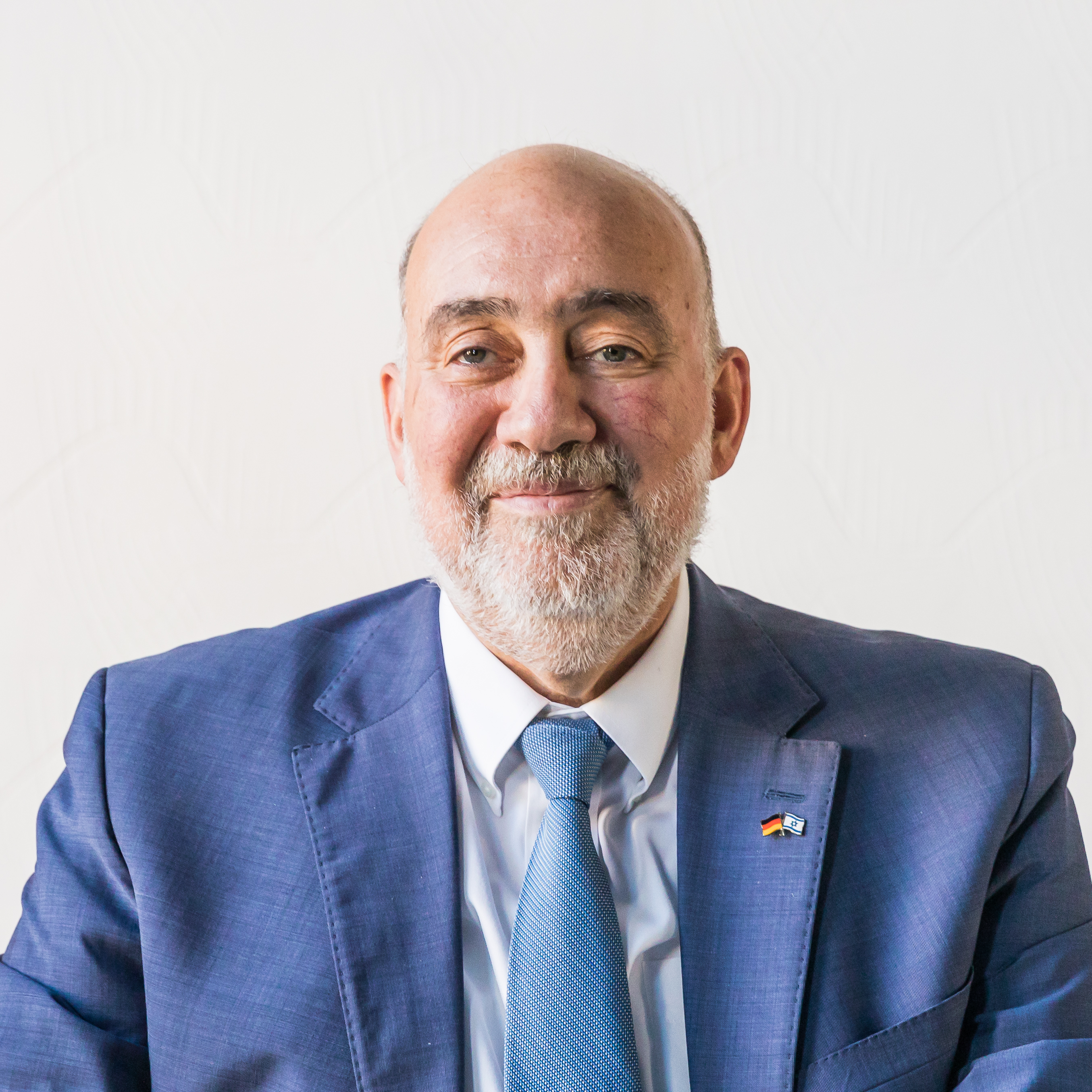

Israeli Ambassador to Germany
- Incumbent
- Assumed office 22 August 2022
- President: Isaac Herzog
- Prime Minister: Benjamin Netanyahu
- Preceded by: Jeremy Issacharoff

16th Permanent Representative of Israel to the United Nations
- In office 8 June 2011 – 14 October 2015
- President: Shimon Peres; Reuven Rivlin
- Prime Minister: Benjamin Netanyahu
- Preceded by: Meron Reuben
- Succeeded by: Danny Danon

15th Israeli Ambassador to the United Kingdom
- In office 2007–2011
- Preceded by: Zvi Heifetz

Personal details
- Born: 11 October 1958 (age 67) Kfar Saba, Israel
- Education: Hebrew University of Jerusalem
- Occupation: Diplomat, writer, columnist

Ron Prosor (Hebrew: רון פרושאור; born 11 October 1958) is an Israeli diplomat, writer, and columnist. He has served as Israel's ambassador to Germany since August 22, 2022. He previously served as Israel's Permanent Representative to the United Nations from 2011 to 2015, the Ambassador of Israel to the United Kingdom from 2007 to 2011, as well as Director-General of Israel's Foreign Ministry and political consul at the Israeli embassy in Washington. He is the head of the Abba Eban Institute for International Diplomacy in IDC Herzliya Lauder School of Government, Diplomacy & Strategy.

== Biography ==
Born on 11 October 1958 in Kfar Saba, Israel, Prosor is a graduate of the IDF Battalion Command. As an officer in the Artillery Division of the IDF, Prosor attained the rank of Major. He holds a bachelor's degree and a master's degree in Political Science from the Hebrew University of Jerusalem, graduating with distinction. Prosor and his wife Hadas have three children – Lior, Tomer and Oren – and two grandchildren, Amit and Daniel.

== Diplomatic career and previous postings ==
With almost three decades of experience at the Israeli Ministry of Foreign Affairs, Prosor has carved out an international reputation as one of Israel's most distinguished diplomats. His overseas service also includes roles in Washington, Bonn, and London.

In 1986, he joined the staff of the Foreign Ministry and began fulfilling his duties in Israel's diplomatic missions throughout the world. During his service as a spokesman for the embassy in Bonn, he was one of the first Israeli representatives to establish ties with East Germany and, after its unification with West Germany, he worked to establish relations with the new federal states in its territory. He later served as the spokesman for the Israeli Embassy in London.

He became a political advisor to the Israeli Embassy in Washington (1998–2002) and participated in the Israeli delegation to the negotiations prior to the signing of the Wye Agreement and took part in the Camp David delegation in 2000.

In the headquarters of the Foreign Ministry, he worked in the Western European Division, served as the spokesman for the ministry and served as the Head of the Foreign Ministry's diplomatic staff, as well as the Deputy Director-General of the Foreign Ministry.

Between 2004 and 2007 Prosor served as the Director General of the Israeli Ministry of Foreign Affairs, overseeing the work of the Foreign Ministry during the disengagement from Gaza in 2005.

From 2007 and 2011, he served as Israel's Ambassador to the United Kingdom, where he earned plaudits for his articulate and forthright defense of Israel's position, publishing numerous articles throughout the British press and appearing on television outlets including the BBC and Sky News. He also addressed a wide range of audiences throughout the country, including universities and think tanks.

Prosor served as Israel's Permanent Representative to the United Nations from 2011 to 2015.

In 2022, Prosor was appointed Israel's ambassador to Germany.

== Permanent Representative to the United Nations ==
As Israel's 16th Ambassador to the UN, Prosor has held a series of notable positions, including Vice President of the General Assembly (June 8, 2012) and Chair of the United Nations Human Rights Committee. Prosor called for the first-ever General Assembly session on antisemitism and oversaw the adoption of two landmark resolutions on entrepreneurship and agriculture that passed with an overwhelming majority.

On becoming Israel's Permanent Representative to the United Nations, Prosor continued to be an outspoken proponent for the State of Israel. A prolific writer and commentator, Prosor has published in leading international publications, including The New York Times, The Wall Street Journal, Newsweek and more.

== Foreign policy positions ==
Prosor is known as an outspoken diplomat and delivers speeches on a wide range of topics. He frequently publishes articles on a variety of international publications on Israel's domestic policy and international status.

=== Recognition of Israel ===
On several occasions, Prosor has framed the recognition of Israel's statehood as an existential right for Israel and the Jewish people. According to Prosor, failing to recognize Israel is the greatest obstacle to peace in the region. Therefore, he stressed the necessity for Arab states and the Palestinian Authority to recognize Israel.

In his speech to the UN General Assembly in November 2014, Prosor accused the international community of fueling the Israeli-Palestinian conflict by not understanding the history of the region. He also blamed the Arab States for their wars against Israel, and concluded his address by acknowledging the necessity for the international community to choose between recognizing Israel as the nation-state of the Jewish people or allowing Palestine to deny Israel's rightful claim to its land.

In an op-ed published in The New York Times in March 2015, Prosor faulted the UN for singling out Israel on a variety of issues, for example, human rights, while not addressing more oppressive regimes. He indeed accused the UN of tolerating "repressive regimes that violate human rights and undermine international security" to control the organization.

=== Palestine ===
Prosor faults the Palestinian Authority for being unwilling to negotiate with Israel, as well as the European states which unilaterally recognized a Palestinian state, thus sending the message that "the Palestinian Authority can sit in a government with terrorists and incite violence against Israel without paying any price."

Prosor defends a two-state solution and calls on the international community to "encourage the Palestinians to enter into direct negotiations without preconditions in order to achieve a historical peace process in which a demilitarized Palestinian state will recognize the Jewish state."

In an interview with DW Prosor said a two-state solution to the Israeli-Palestinian conflict could be viable if proponents of a Palestinian state made it clear they expect it to be democratic. "The issue here is what state do you want to establish? We cannot and would not establish a terror state," he said.

=== Hamas ===
Prosor attacks Hamas and seeks to raise awareness among the international community on the necessity to stop funding Hamas terrorist activities. In summer 2014, during that year's conflict in Gaza, Prosor publicly accused Qatar of supporting terrorism.

In an opinion piece in The Telegraph, Prosor accused Hamas of jailing women who remove their veils, throwing political opponents from buildings, and promoting genocide in school and on TV, while pretending to be "moderate" and "reforming." He also complains about weapons smuggling over the Egyptian border, as well as other black market items. Prosor further criticized Hamas for its use of rocket attacks and small-arms fire, which have killed civilians and destroyed homes and buildings. Prosor wrote that the international community should counter Hamas' "extremism" and violence against both Palestinians and Israelis.

=== Qatari financing and support of Hamas terrorism ===
Interviewed in July 2014 by CBS reporter Pamela Falk on the Israeli-Palestinian conflict in Gaza, Prosor claimed that Hamas’ "terror tunnels" were funded by Qatari money, and stressed the necessity to demilitarize the military infrastructure of Hamas towards the reconstruction of Gaza. Prosor compared Qatar's support for Hamas to Iranian military support of terrorism against Israel and more generally in the Middle East. He further noted that Qatar's and Egypt's support for Hamas and the Muslim Brotherhood stood in contrast to other Arab nations and deepened cleavages in the region.

Furthermore, in his "Club Med for Terrorists" op-ed published in August 2014 in The New York Times, Prosor alleged that Qatar sought to improve its global image by funding prominent foreign universities in Doha and hosting the 2022 World Cup while simultaneously supporting Hamas, al-Qaeda, and the Muslim Brotherhood.

He claimed that "hundreds of millions of dollars" of Qatari funds "funneled" to Gaza have ended up in the hands of Hamas, and noted that Qatar "harbors leading Islamist radicals," including Sheikh Yusuf al-Qaradawi (spiritual leader of the Muslim Brotherhood), Abdul Rahman Omeir al-Naimi (designated by the US as a terrorist financier of al-Qaeda), and Khaled Meshal (the leader of Hamas).

In particular, Prosor denounced Qatar's intention to play "a starring role in any cease-fire agreement between Hamas and Israel". In fact, the diplomat argued that Qatar threatened to expel Khaled Meshal – whose uncompromising refusal to recognize Israel has been an obstacle to reaching a peace deal – if "Hamas accepted Egyptian proposals for a long-term cease-fire in Gaza." Prosor concluded the op-ed by calling on Western nations to confront Qatar and demand that it stops financing. Meanwhile, Israel has allowed suitcases holding millions in Qatari cash to enter Gaza through its crossings since 2018 according to the Times of Israel
