= List of ambassadors of Israel to Ukraine =

== List of ambassadors ==
- Michael Brodsky 2021–present
- Joel Lion 2018–2021
- Reuven Din El 2011–2014
- Zina Kalay-Kleitman 2007–2011
- Naomi Ben-Ami 2003–2007
- Anna Azari 1999–2003
- Ehud Eitam 1992–1993
