= List of ambassadors of Israel to Croatia =

== List of ambassadors ==
- Gary Koren 2022–present
- Ilan Mor 2018–2022
- Zina Kalay-Kleitman 2014–2018
- Yossi Amrani 2009–2014
- Shmuel Meirom 2005–2009
- Yael Rubinstein 2003–2005
- David Granit (Non-Resident, Jerusalem) 2001–2003
