= Ada Willenberg =

Polish-Israeli Holocaust survivor

Ada Willenberg עדה וילנברג
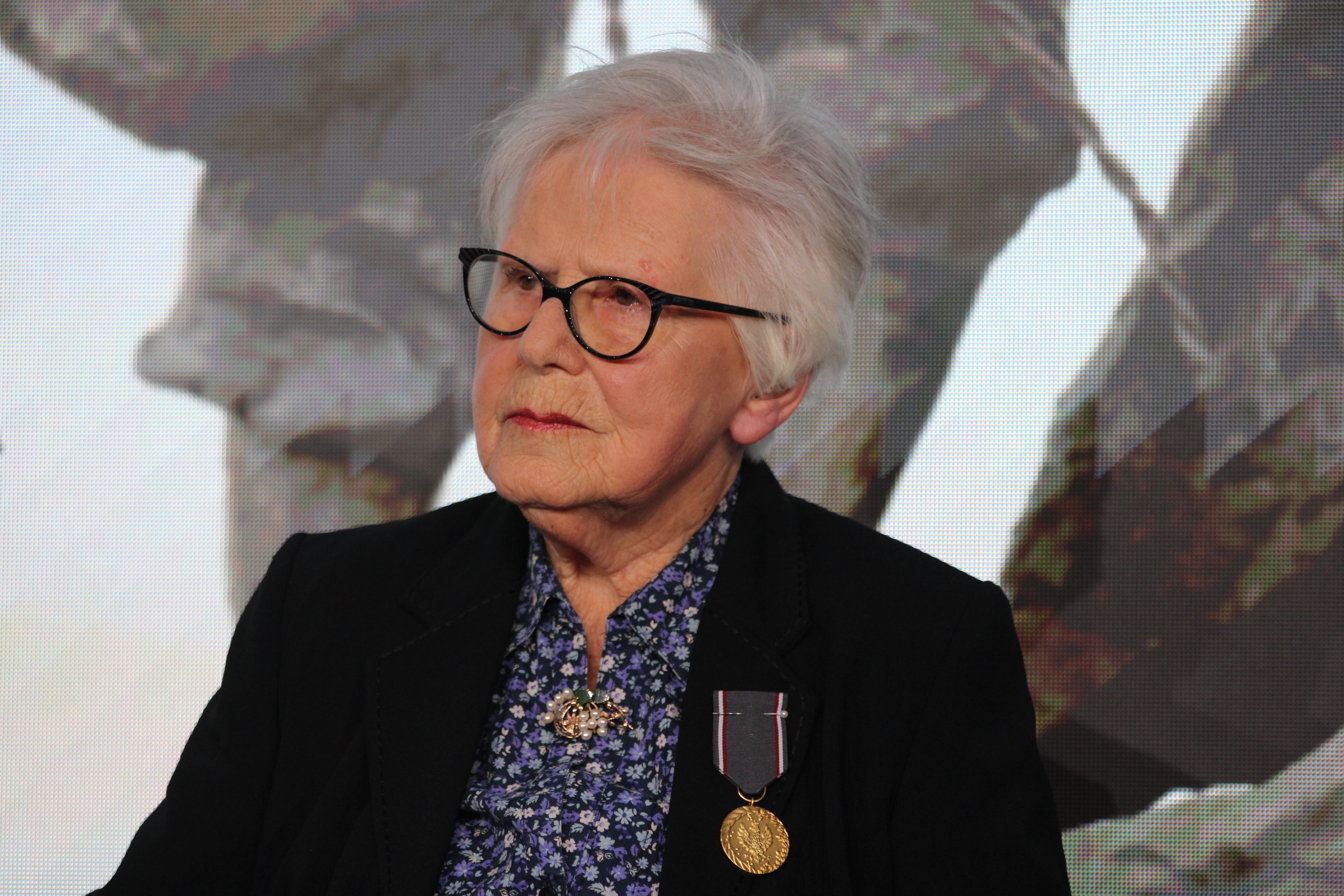
- Ada Willenberg, 2025
- Born: Ada Lubelczyk; 11 January 1929 (age 97); Warsaw, Second Polish Republic
- Known for: Holocaust survivor
- Spouse: Samuel Willenberg (m. 1948)

Ada Willenberg (née Lubelczyk) (Hebrew: -עדה וילנברג) (born 11 January 1929) is a Polish-Israeli Holocaust survivor. She is the widow of fellow Holocaust survivor, sculptor and writer Samuel Willenberg (1923–2016).

== Biography ==
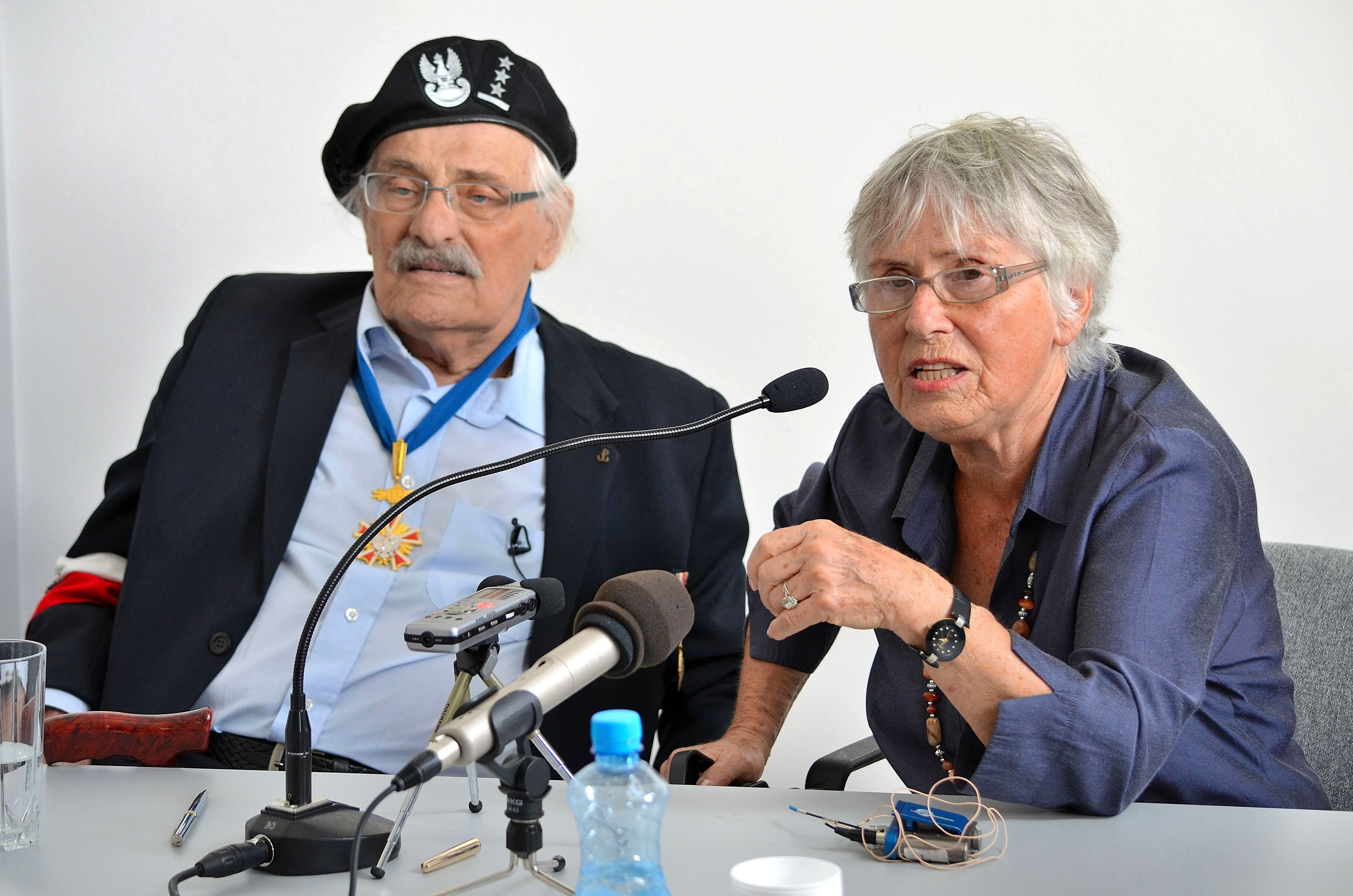
Ada with her husband Samuel Willenberg (1923–2016) at the 70th anniversary of Treblinka revolt, 2013

Ada Lubelczyk was born in Warsaw (Second Polish Republic) in January 1929. She lived in the Jewish quarter of this city, together with her parents, grandmother and uncle. Her parents had a leather goods company, where leather products were produced for (among others) German companies. Ten-year-old Ada moved to Czyżew in 1939, but shortly afterwards the family moved to a three-room apartment in the Warsaw Ghetto, where they lived with other Jewish families. On 18 August 1942 her mother was deported to Treblinka concentration camp, while Ada and her grandmother remained in the ghetto. In March 1943, a few months before the destruction of the ghetto, according to one account, she decided to jump the walls of the ghetto and run for her life; according to another, her escape was organized by a Polish group that specialized in saving Jewish children from the ghetto. After her escape from the ghetto she was sheltered by Polish women, Helena Majewska, later recognized as one of the Polish Righteous Among the Nations. Later Ada got false documents and survived deportation to a farm in Oschatz, Germany, where she worked as a forced laborer until the end of the war.

In 1945, Ada went back to Poland, where she studied dentistry. In 1946, she met Samuel Willenberg, and the two married in 1948. In 1950, during the peak years of Stalinism in Poland, Willenberg emigrated to Israel with her husband and her mother-in-law. She has one daughter, Orit Willenberg-Giladi, and three grandchildren.
