= Shmoel Elyashiv =

Lithuanian diplomat and writer

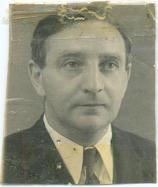

Shmoel Elyashiv (Hebrew: שמואל אלישיב; born Shmuel Fridman, October 11, 1899, Pinsk, Russian Empire – June 20, 1955) was an Israeli diplomat and writer.

== Biography ==
Elyashiv was raised in Kovno. He studied jurisprudence in Moscow and Kyiv, graduated in Kharkiv in 1921. In 1927, he received his doctorate in political science from the University of Toulouse and in 1928, was practicing as a jurist in Kovno. Elyashiv was chairman of the central committee of the Zionist Socialist Party from 1927 until 1934, when he emigrated to Palestine.

== Career ==
=== Politics/diplomacy ===
He held several positions with Histadrut from 1937 until 1948. He left to become the manager of the East European section in the Israeli Ministry of Foreign Affairs. He served as ambassador to Prague, Czechoslovakia and Budapest, Hungary from 1950 until 1951. He was a member of the Israeli delegation to the United Nations in 1950 and 1952 and served as Israel's ambassador to Moscow, 1951–1955.,

=== Literary career ===
Elyashiv became a prominent analyst of Soviet literature during the early Cold War period. His 1953 monograph Hasifrut hasovyetit hachadashah examined ideological shifts in post-Stalinist Soviet writing, with a focus on state censorship mechanisms and adaptations of socialist realism. The work drew from primary sources, including transcripts of Soviet Writers' Union congresses and firsthand interviews with émigré authors. From 1952 to 1955, he delivered a lecture series at the Hebrew University of Jerusalem analyzing parallels between Soviet and Zionist literary nation-building narratives.

=== Literary works ===
- Di histadrut (The Histadrut) (Tel Aviv, 1947) (textbook)
- Ukrainishe motivn (Ukrainian motifs), short stories (Berlin-Paris, 1926)
- Le problème des minorités ethniques (Paris: Librairie Generale de Droit and de Jurisprudence, 1927)
- Rishme masa (Impressions of a journey) (Tel Aviv, 1951),
- Hasifrut hasovyetit hachadashah (New Soviet literature) (Tel Aviv, 1953)
