= Shimon Stein =

Israeli diplomat (born 1948)

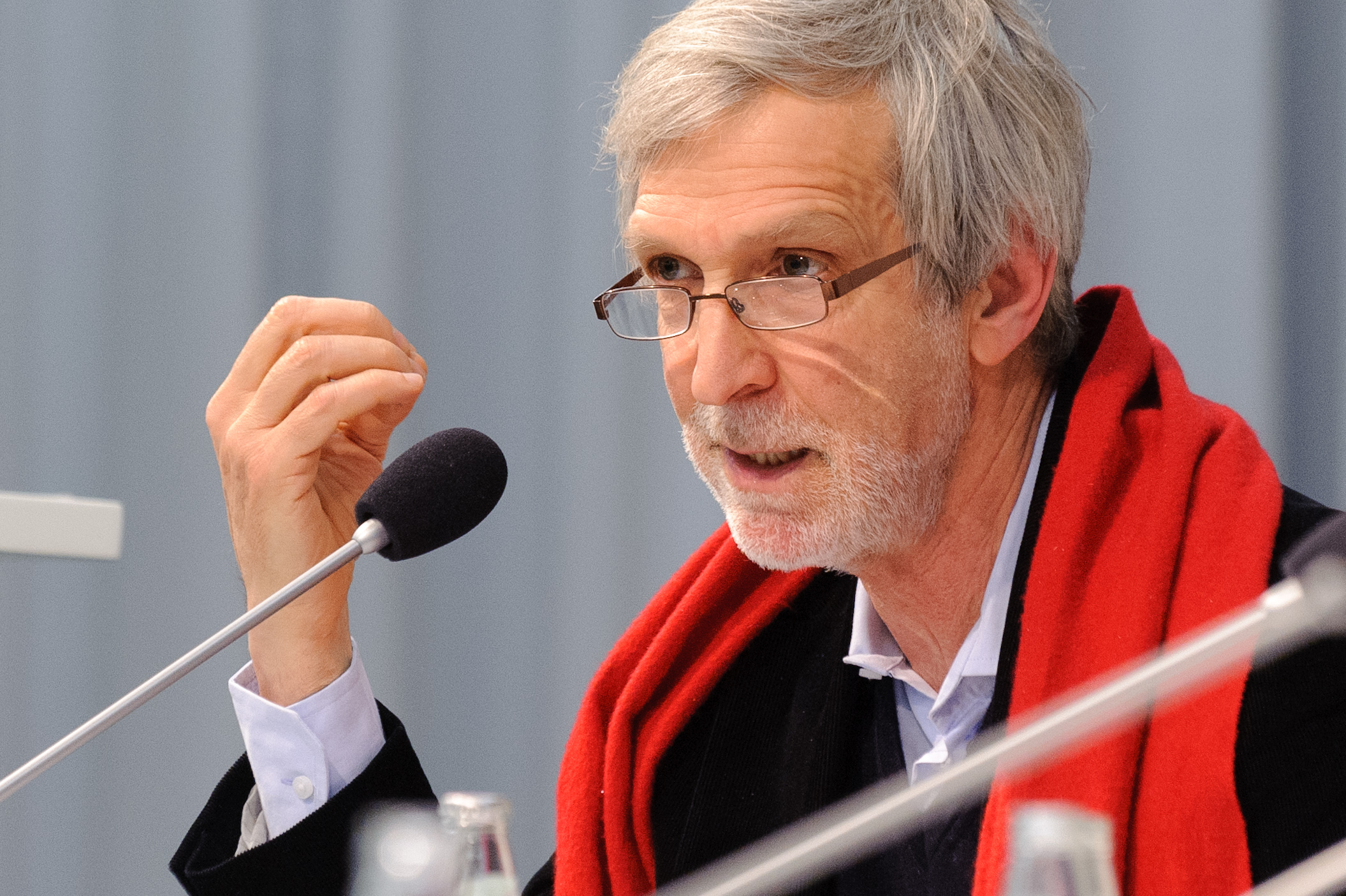
- Born: March 9, 1948 (age 78); Hadera, Mandatory Palestine
- Occupation: Diplomat

Shimon Stein (born 9 March 1948) is an Israeli diplomat. He was the Israeli ambassador to Germany from 2001 to 2007. On 1 January 2001, the first day of his ambassadorship, he was sent to Berlin. Toby Axelrod writes in the 2002 American Jewish Year Book:

Stein not only had the unenviable task of representing his country to one of its most important supporters during an exceptionally difficult time in Israel's history, but he also followed a very popular ambassador, Avi Primor, who, in pre-intifada days, often criticized his own government—in fluent German—and was a darling of the country's official, intellectual, and media circles. Stein quickly cemented strong connections with the government, and consistently challenged unfair criticism of Israel.

On 11 August 2002 he attended a memorial marking the 30th anniversary of the Munich massacre, where during the 1972 Summer Olympics Israeli athletes were held hostage by Black September, who eventually killed 11 of them. He was involved in the 2005 deal for Israel to buy German submarines, the first deliveries of which are expected in 2012, and said it would benefit the German shipbuilding industry. At his farewell reception he summarised his tenure as "exciting, satisfying, frustrating, rewarding, enlightening". He was replaced by Yoram Ben-Zeev.

Stein remains close friends with German chancellor Angela Merkel. Previously, he was a senior analyst at the Centre for Political Research, and held a number of posts in the Ministry of Foreign Affairs.

In 2006 Stein called on the German government to stop Iranian president Mahmoud Ahmadinejad from visiting the FIFA World Cup. He accused the Syrian government of providing weapons to Hezbollah after the 2006 Lebanon War. During a 2007 pilgrimage to Israel by 27 Roman Catholic bishops from Germany, two bishops compared the plight of Palestinians in the West Bank to that of Jews in the Warsaw Ghetto during the Second World War, to which Stein said, "If one uses terms like Warsaw Ghetto or racism in connection with Israeli or Palestinian politics, then one has forgotten everything, or learned nothing". Regarding Germany's relations with Iran and Iran's nuclear program, he said in 2008 Germany needed to reduce trade with Iran even further. He says Iran is a threat not only to Israel but to "so-called moderate Sunni and pro-Western regimes". He said in 2010 of the disparity between government support and popular criticism of Israel in Germany: "This worries me because in democracies, political parties seek public approval for their policies. In the long run, the discrepancy is not good for us or for our friends in Germany." In 2006 he said antisemitism was increasing in Germany.
