= Asher Ben-Natan =

Israeli diplomat (1921–2014)

- אשר בן נתן
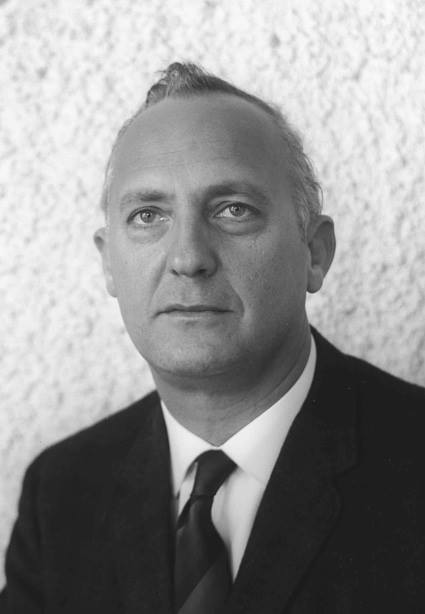

Director General of the Ministry of Defense
- In office 1959–1965
- Appointed by: David Ben-Gurion
- Preceded by: Shimon Peres
- Succeeded by: Moshe Kasti

Israeli Ambassador to Germany
- In office 1965–1970
- Appointed by: Golda Meir
- Preceded by: Post established
- Succeeded by: Eliashiv Ben-Horin

Israeli Ambassador to France
- In office 1970–1974
- Appointed by: Abba Eban
- Preceded by: Walter Eytan
- Succeeded by: Mordechai Gazit

Personal details
- Born: Arthur Piernikartz; February 15, 1921 Austria
- Died: June 17, 2014 (aged 93)
- Spouse: Erika
- Parent: Natan Piernikartz

Asher Ben-Natan (Hebrew: אשר בן נתן; February 15, 1921 – June 17, 2014) was an Israeli diplomat and a key figure in the country's defense and diplomacy fields. Ben-Natan led the search for Nazi war criminal Adolf Eichmann, who was captured in 1960. He became the Director General of the Israeli Ministry of Defense from 1959 until 1965. Ben-Natan then served as the first Israeli Ambassador to Germany (then West Germany) from August 1965 until 1970. Ben-Natan was then appointed as Israel's Ambassador to France from 1970 until his retirement in 1974.

Asher Ben-Natan was born Arthur Piernikartz in Vienna, Austria, on February 15, 1921. His father, Natan Piernikartz, operated a clothing business in the Austrian capital. He attended a Hebrew High School and was a member of the Young Macabbi. His father bought five-acres of land in Mandatory Palestine in 1934 in response to the emergence of Nazi Germany and the growth of Antisemitism. The family drew up plans to flee to Palestine in 1938 following the Anschluss of Austria. Asher Ben-Natan fled Austria first. He boarded a Panamanian-registered ship in Piraeus, Greece, from which he sailed to Palestine. The ship dropped the passengers off at Tantura, where he swam to the beach. He found work at a kibbutz and changed his name to Asher Ben-Natan in honor of his father. His parents and sister arrived in Palestine from Austria a few months after his own arrival. From 1951 to 1953, he studied at the Graduate Institute of International Studies in Geneva. Asher Ben-Natan married his wife Erika in 1940.

In 1978, he unsuccessfully ran for mayor of Tel Aviv.
