= Jeremy Issacharoff =

Israeli diplomat

- ג'רמי יששכרוף
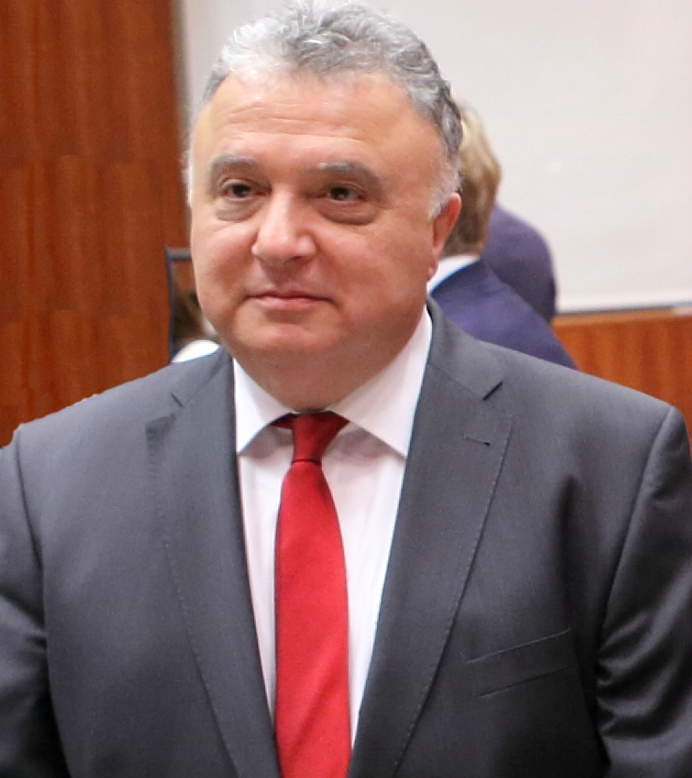

Israeli Ambassador to Germany
- In office 2017–2021
- Preceded by: Yakov Hadas-Handelsman
- Succeeded by: Ron Prosor

Personal details
- Born: 1955 (age 70–71) London, England
- Children: 3
- Education: London School of Economics

Jeremy Issacharoff (Hebrew: ג'רמי יששכרוף; born 1955 in London) is an Israeli diplomat who served as Israel’s Ambassador to Germany from 2017 to 2022, succeeding Yakov Hadas-Handelsman. Before that, he was Vice Director General of the Ministry of Foreign Affairs. He has also served as deputy director general for strategic affairs and as such, has had the opportunity to be involved in various issues relating to Iran's nuclear program.

While he was the third highest ranking official at the Israeli Embassy in Washington in 1994, he was the first Israeli to have official contact with the UAE.

In 2020, Issacharoff spoke out about antisemitic and anti-Muslim attacks in Halle and Hanau, saying "No democratic society can survive if minorities are constantly threatened or harmed. ... The Holocaust has shown us all where such hatred leads." He has also criticized Rafi Eitan for his public endorsement of the far-right Alternative for Germany (AfD) party writing "It is hard to believe how the person who captured Eichmann ... is able to praise German right-wingers who so admire the Nazi past and wish on us that they become the alternative of Europe! Sad and shameful."

== Life ==
Since 1982, Issacharoff has worked for Israeli government. From 1993 to 1998 and again from 2005 to 2009 Issacharoff worked as diplomat in Washington, D.C. at Embassy of Israel in Washington, D.C. In 2005, while Deputy Chief of Mission in Washington, he was given the rank of Senior Ambassador. He was offered an ambassadorship to India but turned it down due to an illness in the family.

Born in London in 1955, Issacharoff is of Bukharian Jewish descent. He graduated from the London School of Economics with a LLB.

Issacharoff is married to Laura Kam, a public relations executive and has three children. In March 2020, at an early stage of the epidemic, Issacharoff tested positive for COVID-19.
