= Yoram Ben-Zeev =

Israeli diplomat

- יורם בן-זאב
- Born: July 20, 1944 (age 81)
- Occupation: Diplomat

Yoram Ben-Zeev (Hebrew: יורם בן-זאב; born 20 July 1944) is an Israeli diplomat and former Israeli ambassador to Germany. Born in the Palestine Mandate (modern day Israel) on 20 July 1944—the date of the attempted assassination of Adolf Hitler, a fact described as symbolic by Ulrich W. Sahm of haGalil—he served as a lieutenant in the Israel Defense Forces (IDF) in the 1967 Six-Day War, in which he was wounded. He subsequently obtained a BA (1970) in international relations and took graduate studies (1972) in Middle Eastern studies and political science from the Hebrew University of Jerusalem. After some years working in the Ministry of Foreign Affairs and in embassies in Manila and Hong Kong, he was adviser to the president from 1987 to 1993. After this he took on diplomat roles involving the Middle East and North America, before he was appointed Israeli ambassador to Germany in 2007, replacing Shimon Stein. He said one of his goals of his ambassadorship is to deepen relations between Israel and the European Union, and to improve relations with the German public—the European peoples most critical of Israel according to surveys. He is married to Iris and has three children.

When in 2007 German media reported that an Israeli organisation, Nativ, was encouraging German Jews to relocate to Israel, Ben-Zeev said the aim was only to give them a sense of Israeli culture: "The main purpose of Nativ is to bring to those communities a sense of the Jewish culture, the Israeli culture and to help with education. The agenda is not to become movers of the communities to Israel." During the 2008–2009 Gaza War he said that Hamas in Gaza was not just a terrorist organisation but a terrorist government, and that the organisation was backed by Iran. He said the Israeli offensive was not disproportionate and that they were allowing food and drugs into Gaza. Regarding comments made by Thilo Sarrazin, a former senator of finance of Berlin, that "All Jews share a certain gene; Basques have certain genes that differentiate them from others", Ben-Zeev said he was more interested in the reaction to Sarrazin that the comments themselves.
