= Chil Rajchman =

Holocaust survivor (1914-2004)

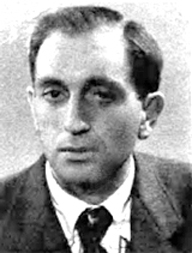
- Chil Rajchman in Poland, c. 1945-1946
- Born: Henryk Reichman; June 14, 1914; Łódź, Congress Poland, Russian Empire
- Died: May 7, 2004 (aged 89); Montevideo, Uruguay
- Known for: Survivor of revolt at Treblinka, author of Treblinka memoir
- Family: Camila Rajchman (granddaughter)

Chil (Enrique) Meyer Rajchman a.k.a. Henryk Reichman, nom de guerre Henryk Ruminowski (June 14, 1914 – May 7, 2004) was one of about 70 Jewish prisoners who survived after participating in the August 2, 1943, revolt at the Treblinka extermination camp in Poland during the Holocaust. He reached Warsaw, where he participated in the resistance in the city, before it was captured by the Soviet Union.

After the war, in which he lost all his family but one brother, Rajchman married. The couple and his brother soon emigrated from Poland, first to France and then to Montevideo, Uruguay, where they later became citizens. There he was active in the Jewish community and helped establish the Museum of the Holocaust and the Holocaust Memorial, both in Montevideo.

In 1980, Rajchman was contacted by the United States Justice Department through the consulate. He was among several survivors who testified against John Demjanjuk, by then a naturalized US citizen, who was suspected of having been a notorious Trawniki, or guard at Treblinka known as "Ivan the Terrible". His testimony contributed to Demjanjuk being prosecuted and convicted in Israel, but this was overturned on appeal. New records from Soviet archives raised questions about his identity. (Demjanjuk was later convicted of charges in Germany related to his documented service at the death camp Sobibor.)

While living in Warsaw, Rajchman wrote a memoir in Yiddish about his time at Treblinka. It was published in Spanish in Uruguay in 1997 as Un grito por la vida: memorias ("A cry for life: memories"). In 2002 he was featured in a Uruguayan documentary, Despite Treblinka, interviewed as one of three survivors of the Treblinka revolt. In addition to other editions in Spanish, his memoir was published posthumously in 2009 in both France and Germany. An English translation was published in 2011 with a preface by noted writer and activist Elie Wiesel.

== Life ==
Rajchman was born on June 14, 1914, in Łódź. His mother died when he was young, and he was one of six children (four boys and two girls) raised by his widowed father. They struggled to make enough money to live. As tensions increased in Europe, he said good-bye to his brother Moniek in 1939, encouraging him to flee to the Soviet Union.

After the invasion of Poland by Nazi Germany that year, Rajchman and younger sister Anna joined the family in Pruszków, a small town in central Poland. The Jewish ghetto was created there in October 1940, and liquidated in February 1941. All Pruszków Jews were deported to the Warsaw Ghetto. With the work-permit issued by the Judenrat on German orders, Rajchman was sent to live and work in Ostrów Lubelski, in eastern Poland. He was rounded up on October 10, 1942, along with other ghetto inmates, loaded onto a Holocaust train, and sent to Treblinka extermination camp.

Upon his arrival there the following day, Rajchman was separated from his sister Anna (she died at the camp), and put to work with the Jewish Sonderkommando. He was ordered to cut the hair of disrobed women before they were gassed. Later he extracted gold teeth from dead victims at the Totenlager and disposed of thousands of their bodies, mostly by burning.

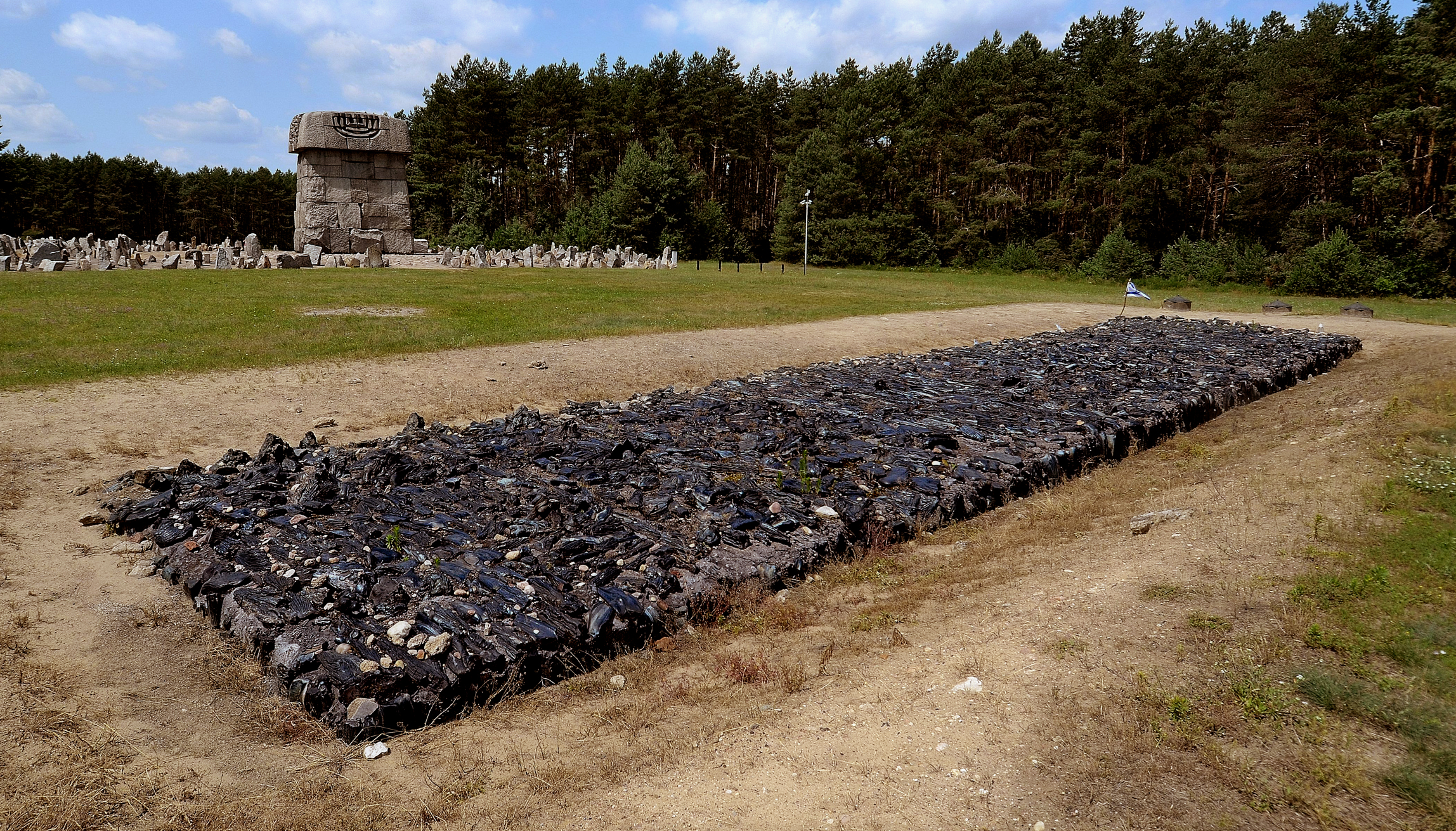
Stone memorial at the Treblinka museum, resembling the original cremation pit where the bodies were burned. The flat grave marker is constructed of crushed and cemented black basalt symbolizing burnt charcoal. Human ashes mixed with sand are spread over 22,000 square meters at the camp.

On August 2, 1943, Rajchman was among 700 Sonderkommandos who revolted against the guards. He was with some one hundred prisoners who escaped during this attack. The death camp was closed in October 1943. Rajchman had reached Warsaw, where he joined the resistance. He was among the 70 men from the revolt to survive through the end of the war. During his time in Warsaw, he joined the Polish Socialist Party and the underground resistance.

On January 17, 1945, he was liberated by the advancing Soviets. Fourteen days later, he returned to his hometown of Łódź, where most Jews had already been exterminated. His father and all siblings but Moniek had died in the war. He and Moniek happened to meet again in Poland, near where they had said good-bye. Rajchman married Lila in Warsaw in 1946.

Together with Moniek, the three soon emigrated to France, and relatively soon to Uruguay, where they settled in Montevideo in their early 30s. Rajchman and his wife had three children together. They became active in the Jewish community of Montevideo, which included other European refugees. Rajchman was among the activists who helped gain founding of the Museum of the Holocaust and the Holocaust Memorial, both in Montevideo.

In 1980, Rajchman (then age 66) was contacted in Uruguay by the American embassy. On March 12, 1980, he was interviewed by the Office of Special Investigations of the US Department of Justice about the Trawniki men, Treblinka guards drawn from Soviet prisoners of war. He went to the United States to testify against John Demjanjuk, who had been in the US for years and was a naturalized citizen. Demjanjuk was later extradited to Jerusalem and convicted by Israel in a war trial in 1987–1988.

Rajchman was among witnesses who identified Demjanjuk as the Trawniki guard known as "Ivan the Terrible". He had failed to identify him from a wartime photograph, but identified Demjanjuk at trial. Rajchman's testimony contributed to Demjanjuk's conviction, although he was later released on appeal because new evidence about his identity was found in newly declassified Soviet archives made available to researchers. He was stripped of U.S. citizenship. and later extradited to Germany. There he was charged with other crimes related to his documented service at the death camp Sobibor.

Lila Rajchman died in an accident in 1991. Rajchman died in 2004 in Montevideo, Uruguay, survived by their three children and eleven grandchildren, including Camila Rajchman.

== Legacy and honors ==
The Last Jew of Treblinka: A Memoir

While in Warsaw in 1944–1945, Rajchman wrote a memoir in Yiddish: Zichroines foen Jechiël Meir Rajchman (Henryk Romanowski). He later said that his original manuscript had been edited and proofread in 1946 by poet Nachum Bomze (Bumse). It was first published in Spanish in Montevideo, as Un grito por la vida: memorias ("A cry for life: memories", 1997) by Ediciones de la Banda Oriental. (Additional Spanish editions were published in 2005 and 2009.)

After Rajchman's death in 2004, four translated editions were also published posthumously. The memoir was published in French in 2009 by Les Arènes under the title Je suis le dernier Juif (I am the last Jew). It was published in German the same year as Ich bin der letzte Jude. Treblinka 1942/43. It was published in 2010 in Dutch by J.M. Meulenhoff, directly translated from the Yiddish typoscript by Ruben Verhasselt, as Een van de laatsten. Het unieke ooggetuigenverslag van een overlevende van Treblinka ("One of the last: The unique eyewitness report of a survivor of Treblinka"), with a preface by Elie Wiesel and afterwords by Annnette Wieviorka and David Barnouw. It was published in English in 2011, as The Last Jew of Treblinka: A Memoir, also with a preface by the noted writer and activist Elie Wiesel.

Documentary

Chil (Enrique) Rajchman was featured late in life in the Uruguayan documentary film Despite Treblinka (2002), along with fellow survivors of the revolt, Kalman Taigman and Samuel (Schmuel) Willenberg, then living in Jerusalem. The film premiered at the 24th International Film Festival of New Latin American Cinema in Havana, Cuba.
