= Yossi Amrani =

Israeli diplomat

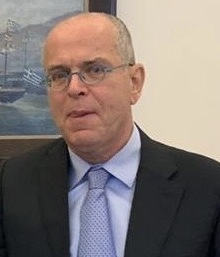
Yossi Amrani, 2019 (49263370612) (cropped)

Yossi Amrani (Hebrew: יוסי עמרני; born Haifa, 1958) is an Israeli diplomat who is the Israeli Ambassador to Greece.

== Biography ==
Amrani earned a BA and MA cum laude in history from the University of Haifa and the Hebrew University of Jerusalem, respectively.

== Career ==
- 2016 - 2019 Ambassador Extraordinary and Plenipotentiary to Hungary
- 2014 - 2016 Head of Policy Planning Division, Ministry of Foreign Affairs
- 2012 - 03/2014 Non-resident Ambassador to the Republic of North Macedonia
- 2009 - 03/2014 Ambassador Extraordinary and Plenipotentiary to Croatia
- 2008 Minister, West Europe Division, Policy Analysis and Planning, Ministry of Foreign Affairs
- 2000-2004 Consul General based in San Francisco
