= Samuel Willenberg =

Polish survivor of Treblinka (1923–2016)

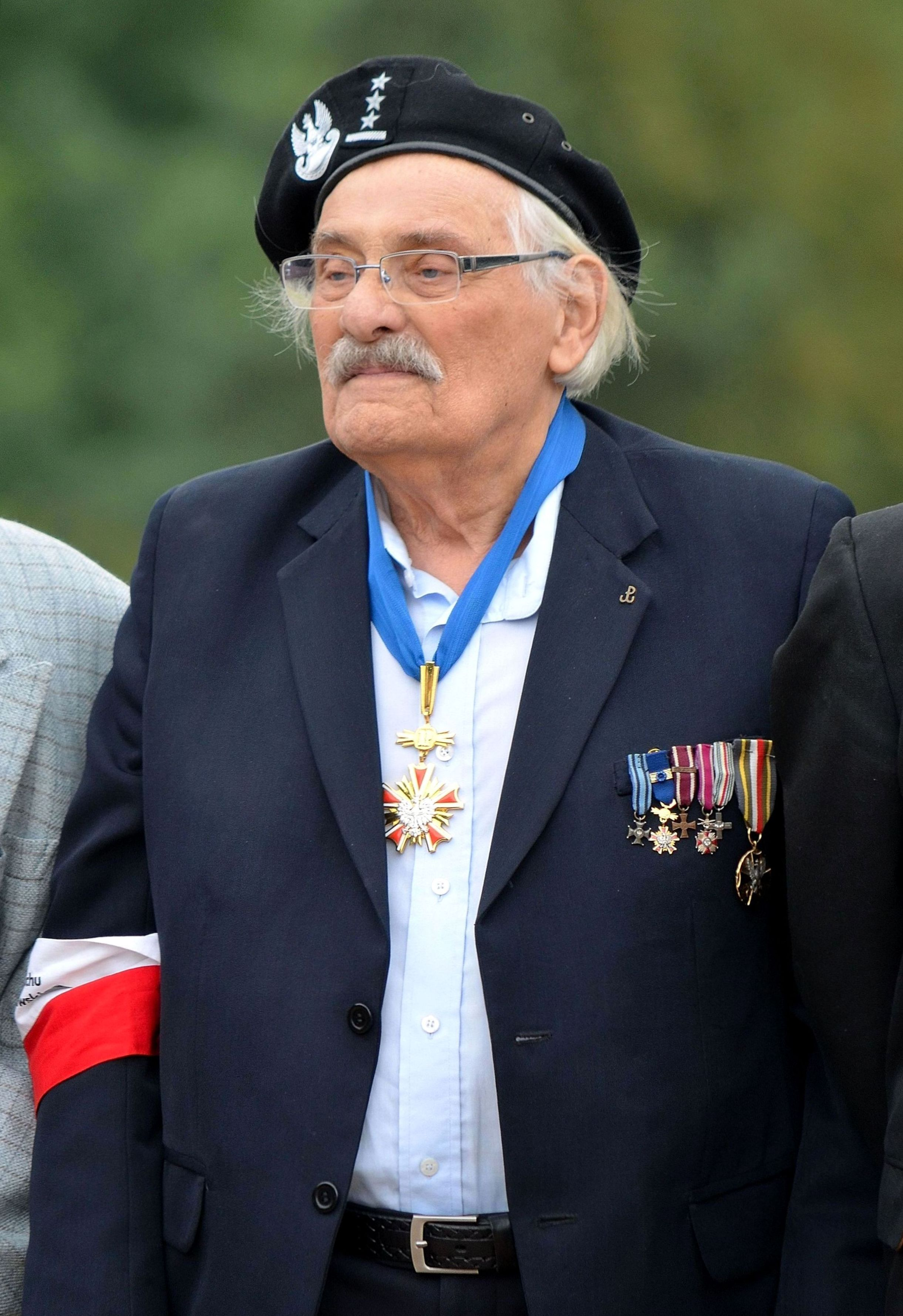
- Samuel Willenberg at Treblinka, 2 August 2013
- Born: 16 February 1923; Częstochowa, Kielce Voivodeship Poland
- Died: 19 February 2016 (aged 93); Udim, Israel
- Known for: Holocaust art
- Movement: Realism, post-expressionism
- Spouse: Ada Willenberg (m. 1948)

Samuel Willenberg, nom de guerre Igo (16 February 1923 – 19 February 2016), was a Polish-born Jewish Holocaust survivor, artist, and writer. He was a Sonderkommando at the Treblinka extermination camp and participated in the unit's planned revolt in August 1943. While 300 escaped, about 79 were known to survive the war. Willenberg reached Warsaw where, before war's end, he took part in the Warsaw Uprising. At his death, Willenberg was the last survivor of the August 1943 Treblinka prisoners' revolt.

Like many other survivors, Willenberg emigrated to Israel. He received Poland's highest orders, including the Virtuti Militari and the Commander's Cross of the Order of Merit, awarded by President Lech Kaczyński.

His memoir, Revolt in Treblinka, was published between 1986 and 1991 in Hebrew, Polish, and English. He was a sculptor and painter.

== Life and work ==
Samuel Willenberg was born in Częstochowa, Poland. His father, Perec Willenberg, was a teacher at a local Jewish school before World War II, a talented painter and visual artist. He also earned money decorating synagogues. His mother, Maniefa Popow, was a Polish-Orthodox Christian who converted to Judaism after their wedding. The family lived in Częstochowa before relocating to Warsaw.

=== Nazi invasion of Poland ===
In the course of the Nazi German invasion of Poland, on 6 September 1939 the 16-year-old Willenberg set off in the direction of Lublin to join the Polish Army as a volunteer. Within days, the Soviets invaded from the east. He was severely wounded on 25 September in a skirmish with the Red Army near Chełm, and captured. Three months later, he escaped from the hospital back to central Poland to reconnect with his family in Radość (now a part of Warsaw). With his mother and two sisters, in early 1940 they went to Opatów, where his father was working on murals for the synagogue. But at this time, the Nazis began herding Polish Jews into ghettos all across the country.

The Opatów Ghetto was established in the spring of 1941, originally without a fence. It quickly became hazardous. The Jews deported from Silesia were brought there, and an epidemic of typhus broke out, due to overcrowding and poor sanitation. Willenberg traded his father's paintings for food and other necessities, but also worked at a steel mill in Starachowice for several months, along with hundreds of forced laborers supplied by the Judenrat.

In 1942, the Nazis began their secretive Operation Reinhard — a planned extermination action of Jews in the semi-colonial General Government district — marking the most deadly phase of the Holocaust in Poland. The Willenbergs managed to obtain false "Aryan" papers, and escaped back to their hometown. The Ghetto in Częstochowa was set up on 9 April 1941. At its peak, it held around 40,000 prisoners. Willenberg's two sisters, Ita and Tamara, were transported there. His mother tried to rescue them and sent Willenberg back to Opatów.

But on 20 October 1942 Willenberg was forced to board a Holocaust train along with 6,500 inmates of the then-liquidated Opatów ghetto, and was sent with them to the extermination camp at Treblinka.

=== Treblinka death camp ===
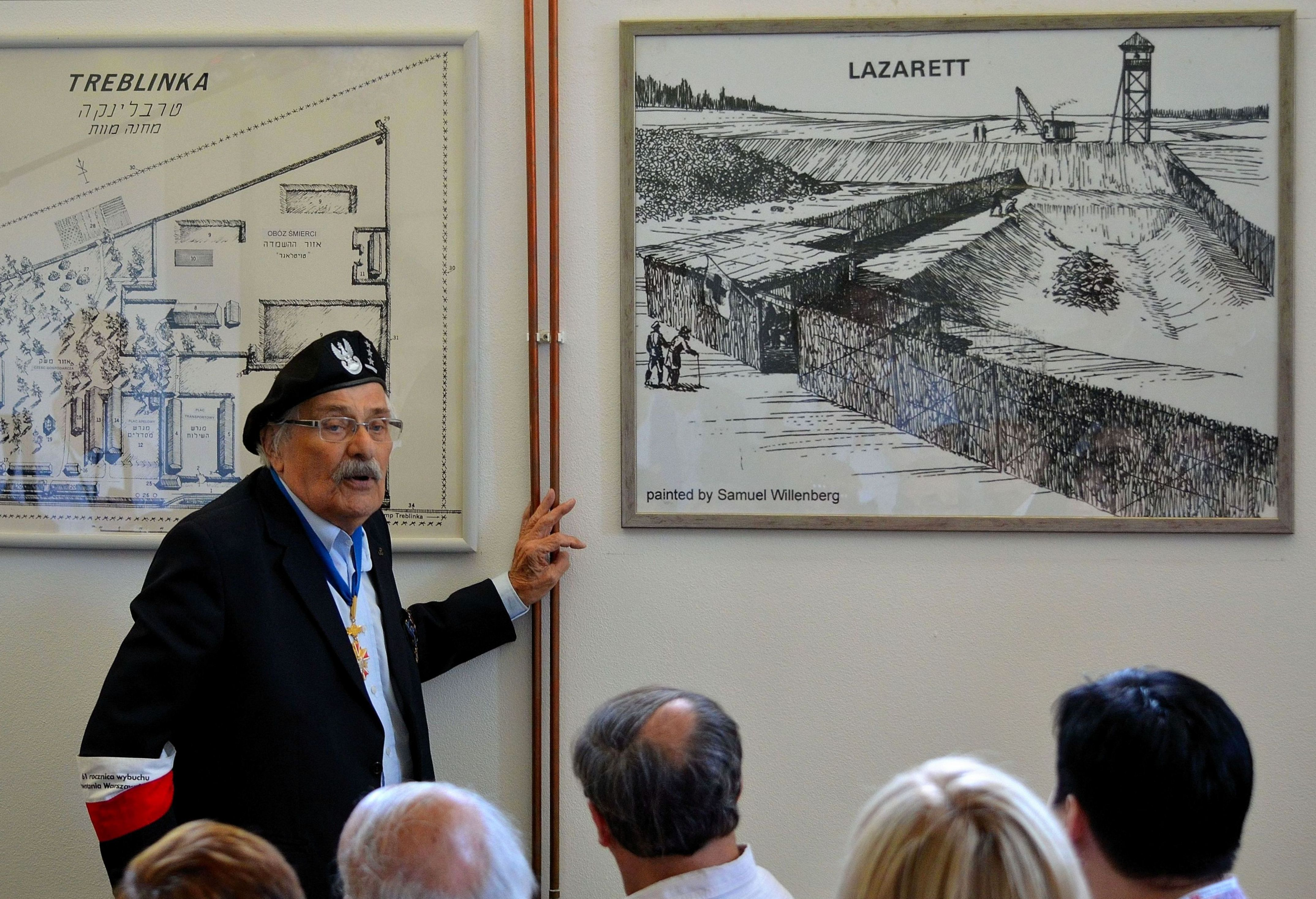
Willenberg with his Treblinka studies at the Treblinka Museum permanent exhibition

The camp, which was built as part of Operation Reinhard (the most deadly phase of the Final Solution), operated between 23 July 1942 and 19 October 1943. During this time, more than 800,000 Jews—men, women, and children—were murdered there. Other estimates of the number killed at Treblinka exceed 1,000,000.

Upon his arrival at Treblinka, Willenberg received a life-saving piece of advice at the unloading ramp, from one of the Jewish Auffanglager prisoners. He posed as a seasoned bricklayer to show he could work. Luckily, he was wearing a paint-stained smock-frock of his father's (an outer garment traditionally worn by rural workers), donned in Opatów in preparation for slave labor. Willenberg was the only person from his transport of 6,000 persons who escaped death in the gas chambers that day.

At first, he was assigned to the camp's largest Kommando Rot, unpacking and sorting the belongings of victims already "processed". He later recognized the clothes of his own two sisters there, confirming they had been killed. With time, he was assigned to other squads as number "937" in the Sonderkommando. Among their tasks was weaving tree branches into the barbed-wire fences in order to hide the grounds, buildings and lines of prisoners. On 2 August 1943 Willenberg participated in the revolt of Sonderkommandos at Treblinka with about 200–300 others. Unlike most of them, he escaped.

Wounded in the leg, he journeyed back to Warsaw, where he managed to find his father, who was hiding on the "Aryan" side of the city. Willenberg became involved in the underground resistance, including acquiring weapons for the left-wing partisan Polish People's Army PAL (Polska Armia Ludowa PAL). He used his mother's maiden name, Ignacy Popow. He was hiding at a safe-house on Natolińska street, when the Warsaw Uprising erupted.

In his memoir, Revolt in Treblinka, Willenberg wrote that on the first day of the Uprising he joined Batalion Ruczaj of the Armia Krajowa Sub-district I. He fought in Śródmieście along Marszałkowska Street and Savior Square. At the beginning of September 1944, he transferred to the Polish People's Army with the rank of cadet sergeant. After the surrender of Warsaw, he left the city with the civilian population. He escaped from the prisoner train in Pruszków and hid in the vicinity of Błonie until the Soviet liberation.

=== Postwar years ===
In 1945–1946, Willenberg served in the Polish Army as a lieutenant. In 1947, he helped one of the Jewish organizations in Poland find Jewish children who had been taken in and rescued from the Holocaust by Polish Gentile families. He married Ada Willenberg (née Lubelczyk), who had escaped from the Warsaw Ghetto by climbing over a wall.

In 1950, during the peak years of Stalinism in Poland, Willenberg emigrated to Israel with his wife and mother. Willenberg took up training as an engineer surveyor and obtained a long-term position of Chief Measurer at the Ministry of Reconstruction. He and his wife had a daughter, Orit, together.

After retiring, Willenberg completed formal studies in the field of fine arts. He graduated in sculpture at The Hebrew University of Jerusalem and quickly became known for his work on the Holocaust. He created mainly figurative sculpture in clay and bronze. His series of fifteen bronze casts depicting people and scenes from the Treblinka death camp, as well as several maps and drawings of the camp, were exhibited internationally. Since 1983, he was the co-organizer of regular visits of Israeli youth to Poland, known as the March of the Living.

In 2003, the Warsaw National Gallery of Art Zachęta held an exhibition of his work. His sculpture was also shown at the Museum of Częstochowa in 2004. He created the Holocaust monument to the 40,000 victims of the Częstochowa Ghetto, which was unveiled there in October 2009.

Willenberg first published his memoir Revolt in Treblinka in 1986. (The English translation by Naftali Greenwood, was published by Oxford University Press, 1989), which he later published in Poland with the preface by Władysław Bartoszewski (1991 and 2004).

On 19 February 2016, Willenberg died in Israel, the last survivor of the Treblinka revolt. He was survived by his wife, Ada, their daughter Orit Willenberg-Giladi, and three grandchildren. An architect, Willenberg-Giladi designed the Israeli embassy in Berlin after unification; it was completed in 2001. In 2013 she was selected as the architect to design a Holocaust education center on the site of Treblinka.

== Legacy and honors ==
- Willenberg was eulogized after his death by Israeli President Reuven Rivlin.
- Willenberg received the highest national honors of the Republic of Poland, including Virtuti Militari, the Cross of Merit with Swords, the Cross of Valor, Warsaw Cross of the Uprising, the Polish Army Medal, and the Order of Merit of the Republic of Poland, which was bestowed upon him by President Lech Kaczyński. Willenberg was the final survivor of the 1943 Treblinka prisoner uprising, after the death of his lifelong friend and Treblinka survivor Kalman Taigman in August 2012 (age 88).

== Documentary ==
- Willenberg is the subject and a leading figure in the documentary film by Michał Nekanda-Trepka, with music by Zygmunt Konieczny, titled The Last Witness (Ostatni świadek, 2002). It was produced by Studio Filmowe Everest for TVP 2. It tells the story of the Treblinka extermination camp and the 1943 rebellion by prisoners, including his friend Kalman Taigman. The film was awarded a silver medal at the international documentary film competition in Stockholm in 2002.
- Willenberg and Taigman appeared in two other documentaries about Treblinka: A Uruguayan documentary, Despite Treblinka (2002), also included Chil Rajchman, a revolt survivor who had settled in Montevideo after the war. Willenberg and Taigman were interviewed and filmed in Israel.
- BBC Four produced Death Camp Treblinka: Survivor Stories (2012, original title), written by Adam Kemp. It featured Willenberg and Taigman as revolt survivors and was aired the same year in the United States as Treblinka's Last Witness.

== See also ==
- Jankiel Wiernik, Treblinka survivor, author of the 1944 memoir: A Year in Treblinka (Rok w Treblince)
- Chil Rajchman, Treblinka revolt survivor, author of a 1945 memoir The Last Jew of Treblinka
- Kalman Taigman, Treblinka revolt survivor
