= Carl Rubin =

Carl Rubin may refer to:

- Carl Rubin (architect) (1899–1955), Israeli architect
- Carl Bernard Rubin (1920–1995), American federal judge
