= Maurice Fischer =

Israeli diplomat

Maurice (Moshe) Fischer (January 23, 1903, Anvers - August 20, 1965, Zurich) was an agent with Mossad LeAliya Bet, an intelligence officer in the Free French army in Lebanon and Syria, the contact person of the Yishuv leadership with French intelligence, an Israeli diplomat, the first Israeli Ambassador to France, Minister to Turkey from 1953 until 1957, deputy director of the Ministry of Foreign Affairs and Ambassador to Italy from 1961 to 1965.

== Biography ==
Maurice Fischer was born in Antwerp, Belgium, in 1903, the son of Sophie (nee Landy) and Jean (Yona) Fischer, a diamantaire and Zionist activist. He studied in Belgium at Brussels College and immigrated to Israel in 1930. At first he lived with his family in Tel Aviv. In 1933 he moved to a villa, which is now located at 19 Ma'ale Hascopus St., Ramat Gan. The two-story building was designed by the architect Carl Rubin in the Bauhaus style and is currently listed as a conservation building.

=== Kfar Yona ===
Fisher engaged in settlement and agriculture, and together with his uncle Yehoshua (Oscar) Fisher, founded the village Kfar Yona, named after his father. In 1932 he was, along with Yitzhak Rokah and Shlomo Gotthilf one of the founders of a company called "Hasharon Orchards", which operated in the 1930s and engaged in agricultural cultivation with the help of hired laborers on land purchased by Jews from abroad in the Kfar Yona. In 1940, the company fell into debt, and was apparently shut down.

=== Cooperation with French intelligence ===
On March 15, 1942, Fischer joined the Free French Army. He moved with his family to live in Sidon and later in Beirut. He served as an officer in French intelligence in Syria and Lebanon until July 1946 under the name Edouard Lavergne. In addition, Fischer served as a liaison between de Gaulle's movement and the leaders of the Yishuv in Israel. Fischer was behind the Ben-Gurion meeting With General Paul Bain, the head of the French mission in Syria and Lebanon, in a meeting held in October 1944 In Beirut, a secret Zionist-French cooperation was established, which gave Eliyahu Sasson, head of the Arab wing of the Jewish Agency, and a small group in the political department of the Jewish Agency, access to French sources of information - including Syrian and British secret documents. The cooperation with French intelligence was a key element in Ben- Gurion's ability to lead the Yishuv and the State of Israel to victory in the face of the secret British intelligence plan, the 'Clayton Plan', to prevent the implementation of the partition plan and the establishment of a Jewish state. For his service, he received medals of distinction from the French government and was an officer of the French Legion of Honor.

=== After World War II ===
After World War II he served as political secretary of the Jewish Agency in Paris under Moshe Sneh. In 1948, with the establishment of the state of Israel, he was appointed as the representative of the provisional government to the capital of France. At the time, he represented Israel in the United Nations Assembly in Paris. In May 1949, he was promoted to the rank of Israel's ambassador to France, due to its recognition of Israel. Among his actions at that time were the regulation of the independent status of French institutions in the State of Israel, within the framework of the Fischer-Chauvel agreement, delivering the report of the Israeli government regarding the murder of Folke Bernadotte to the Swedish government (1949), served as head The Israeli delegation to the "United Nations Conciliation Commission for Palestine" (1951), was involved in the first contacts of the discussions with Konrad Adenauer regarding the "Reparations Agreement", was a member of the Israeli delegation to UNESCO and more.

In May 1953, Fischer moved to serve as Israel's envoy in Ankara, the capital of Turkey. He served in the position until 1957. After that he served in the Ministry of Foreign Affairs in Jerusalem as the director of the Latin American Department. Later he was appointed as the Deputy General Manager and as the Director of the Western Europe Department. In 1960 he was appointed Israel's ambassador to Italy. At the same time, he also dealt with Vatican City. In addition, he was involved in the organization of Pope Paul VI's visit to Israel. (1964). Maurice Fischer died in 1965 in Switzerland, during his term as ambassador, after a serious illness. He was brought to Jerusalem for burial.

Fisher was married twice. With his first wife, Dina (nee Rizkin), he had two children - art curator Yona Fischer, and his brother Yosef, a social activist within the Jerusalem Foundation. With his second wife, Haya (nee Rizkin), he had a daughter - Dafna.

In 1964, a forest was dedicated in his honour, near Kfar Yehoshua, on behalf of the Jewish National Fund. There are a number of streets in Jerusalem and Kfar Yona named after him.
