= Yona Fischer =

Israeli art curator (1932–2022)

- יונה פישר
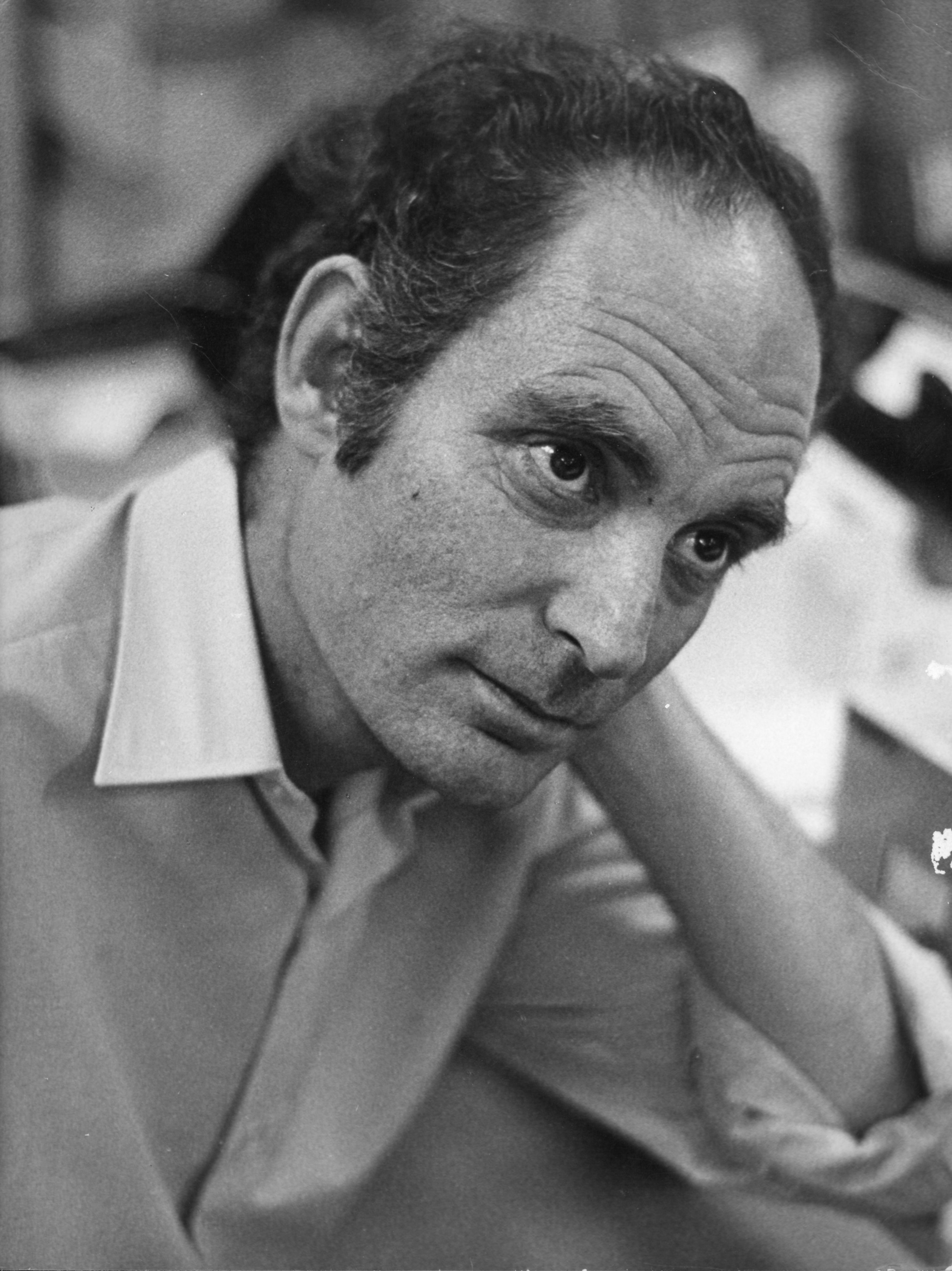
- Born: 20 November 1932; Tel Aviv, Mandatory Palestine
- Died: 3 March 2022 (aged 89); Tel Aviv, Israel
- Occupation: Art curator
- Years active: 1954–2022
- Awards: Israel Prize

Yona Fischer (Hebrew: יונה פישר; 20 November 1932 – 3 March 2022) was an Israeli art curator and art critic. Winner of the Israel Prize for Design for the year 1977.

== Biography ==
Yona Fischer was born in 1932 in Tel Aviv to Maurice Fischer and Dina (nee Rizkin). He was named after his grandfather, Jonah (Jean) Fischer. In 1933 his family moved to live in Ramat Gan. During the Second World War he, together with his brother, joined his father in Sidon and then in Beirut, where he studied at the "Alliance" schools. In 1947 he moved to Paris, France, where his father served as the political secretary of the Jewish Agency. At first he attended the "Maimond" school in Boulogne-Billancourt, a suburb of Paris.[1] After that he attended school in a town called Villard-de-Lans in the French Alps. In his youth he heard lectures on art held at the Louvre Museum. At that time he met the painter Avigdor Arikha, with whom he formed a long-standing friendship. In 1951 he returned to Israel and enlisted in the IDF. He served as a guide for the children of new immigrants within the framework of the Gadna in Be'er Sheva and the suburbs of Jerusalem. After his release, in 1954, he remained living in Jerusalem.

Before becoming a curator, Yona Fischer used to draw, mostly in ink, small landscape sketches that documented his travels. On the 90th anniversary of his birth, some of his drawings were shown in an exhibition at the Kufeferman Collection House, curated by Mayra Perry-Lehmann.

== Professional career ==
=== The Bezalel National Museum: 1954–1965 ===
n 1954, Fischer was hired at the Bezalel National Museum. He was first employed in the museum's archive of reproductions. At the same time, he began writing lists and art reviews in the newspapers "LaMerhav" and "Haaretz", as well as the magazine "Gazit". In addition, Fischer was invited to compose the chapter about Israeli painting in the book "Art of Israel" (1961) edited by Benjamin Tammuz, as well as entries on art in the Encyclopedia Hebraica, including "The Land of Israel, Art (Painting and Sculpture)" and many other entries. In 1959 he went to specialize in treasures in Europe. He first interned with Willem Sandberg and Hans Jaffé at the Stedelijk Museum in Amsterdam, and then at the Kunstmuseum in Basel with Georg Schmidt. On his way to specialization, he served as a substitute curator for the Israeli exhibition set up by Eugen Kolb for the "First Biennale for Young Artists" in Paris (La Biennale des jeunes artistes), which included artists from around the world. Fischer's meeting with the avant-garde art of the time, and especially with the artists of the "nouveau realisme", had a decisive influence on the formation of his artistic inclination.

Upon his return to Israel, at the end of 1960, he was appointed the artistic director of the museum. In his work as a museum curator he introduced young Israeli artists such as Aviva Uri, Yigal Tomarkin, Lea Nikel and others. Along with curating, Fischer also designed catalogs and posters for exhibitions.

=== Curator of the Israel Museum: 1965–1991 ===
With the establishment of the Israel Museum, Fischer moved there to work as a curator of contemporary art. This position united Israeli and international art. At the beginning of his work he was influenced by Sandberg's concept of museum design, who at the time served as an artistic consultant to the New Israel Museum. Fischer's main museological importance was in establishing the post-minimalist and conceptual art trends in Israel. The exhibitions he curated included group exhibitions such as "Concept + Information" (1971), "From the Landscape to Abstraction and from Abstraction to Nature" (1972), "Open Workshop" (1975) and more. In addition, he curated a long series of solo exhibitions for Israeli artists at the beginning of their artistic careers who were influenced by these trends, such as Henry Schlezniak (1969), Pinchas Cohen Gan (1975), Zvi Goldstein (1975) and more. Many of them were exhibited in the "Billy Rose Pavilion", located inside the Billy Rose Art Garden. Among the international artists were solo exhibitions such as "Marcel Duchamp: Ready-Mades, Drawings, Illustrations" (1971), "4,000 Pots by Jean Pierre Reno" (1971), "Sol LeWitt: Murals" (1975) and more.

The museum's acquisitions policy, set by Fischer, was based on three categories of artists: historical art, older and established artists, and young artists. This policy was also expressed in the museum's exhibition schedule. Along with his practice of avant-garde art, Fischer often engaged in canonical Israeli art. Alongside Anna Ticho, Yitzhak Danziger, Arie Aroch and Joseph Zaritsky, among the prominent veteran artists he promoted, Fischer presented many of the prominent painters of the 1930s and 1940s, including Chaim Glicksberg, Pinchas Litvinovsky, Mordechai Levanon and others. In 1968 he curated the exhibition "David's Tower – The Beginning of Painting in the Land" and in 1971, "Art and Craft in the Land of Israel in the Nineteenth Century" (1979), "Expressionism in the Land of Israel in the 1930s" and "Painting in the Light of the Mediterranean" (1987). He introduced the works of prominent Israeli artists like Raffi Lavie and Moshe Kupferman. Fischer and Kupferman met in 1967. Kupferman's first major solo exhibition was curated by Fischer in 1969. Another facet of this policy stands out in the examination of the winners of the "Sandberg Prize", of which Fischer was one of the founders, and a member of the prize committee until his death.

In 1965, together with Rachel Shapira, Moshe Spitzer's secretary, and Dan Omer, he also founded the magazine "Ko", which operated until 1970. The magazine combined international and Israeli poetry and art with other subjects, including architecture. Between the years 1980–1990, 10 issues of the journal were published, edited by Fischer and Moshe Nino.

In 1977 Fischer won the Israel Prize for his contribution to the field of art in Israel. Along with him, Elisheva Cohen also won this award. Since there was no category for the field of curation, the two received a prize in the field of design.

In 1982 Fischer founded the artists' workshops, with the support of the Jerusalem Foundation and other bodies. The workshops allowed the artists to work in the studio at a subsidized price, and in addition, there was a residency program for international artists.

=== Curator of the Tel Aviv Museum: 1991–1993 ===
In 1991 following the curation of a solo exhibition of Nahum Tevet at the Tel Aviv Museum, Fischer was offered the position of chief curator at the museum. Fischer held the position until his resignation in 1993. Among his actions at the museum was obtaining the donation of the art collection of the couple Markus Mizne and Felicja Blumental.

=== Independent curator: 1994–2010 ===
During this period, Fischer served as an independent curator. Along with working as an art consultant, such as a consultant for the art collection of the "Phoenix" insurance company (2004–2010 approximately), he curated exhibitions in various museums, mainly for young artists. In 2002 he curated a retrospective exhibition for Moshe Kupferman at the Israel Museum.

=== Curator of the Ashdod Art Museum: 2004–2011 ===
Between 2004–2011 he served as a curator, and later as a consultant, at the Ashdod Museum of Art. Among the exhibits he curated at the museum, the exhibition "Birth of the Now: The Sixties in Israeli Art" (2008), which he curated with Tamar Manor Friedman, surveyed Israeli art in the late 1950s and 1960s of the 20th century; The group exhibition "Buildings that perish, buildings that perish" (2009), which I curated with Yuval Biton and "Sharon Polyakin: Eight Drawing Lessons" (2012).

=== Documenting his work and perpetuating his family ===
In the second half of the second decade of the 21st century, Fischer began documenting his work and perpetuating his family. In 2018, for example, a translation of a diary written by his grandfather, Jean (Yona) Fischer, after his visit to Israel in 1907 was published. Fischer, who initiated the translation, donated a copy of the original edition of this text to Yad Ben Zvi. At that time he sold part of his art collection and began organizing his archive.

The collection that bears his name was donated by him in 2015 to the Herzliya Museum of Contemporary Art, including works by Aviva Uri and Menashe Kadishman.

On 4 January 2019, the exhibition "Long Lion: The Shape of the Thing" opened at the Israel Museum, which Fischer curated with Amitai Mendelsohn. The exhibition repeated the exhibition "Aryeh Aroh: Times, Places, Forms", which was presented at the museum in 1976. Alongside most of the works presented in the original exhibition, works by Israeli artists who were influenced by Aroh's work were also shown. On the occasion of the exhibition, a book was published, which is an expanded version of the original exhibition catalogue.

== Personal life ==
Fischer lived in Tel Aviv-Yafo together with his partner, Nechama Kaplan. He died at his home on 3 March 2022, at the age of 89. His coffin was placed on 6 March at the Tel Aviv Museum of Art. After that he was buried in the cemetery at Givat Hasholsha.

== Awards and recognition ==
- 1977 recipient of the Israel Prize for his contribution to art in Israel
- In 2013 the Ashdod Museum of Art opened an exhibition of the "Yona Fischer Collection", a collection of artworks by over 50 artists, who contributed works to the museum's collection in his honor.
- In May 2019 the road leading to the Ashdod Museum was named "Yona Road".

== Contributions ==
Fischer's main importance was in encouraging and presenting the Israeli avant-garde art of the 60s and 70s of the 20th century. Fischer's position focused in response to the activity of Haim Gamzo in the Tel Aviv Museum, who rejected this art and chose to present art in traditional media.

Another local innovation of Fischer's was a departure from the prevailing practice in museum exhibitions to present works chronologically, in favour of creating connections between different works of art. In this he was a forerunner of the concept that sees the curator as a figure equal to the artist. According to Fischer, the role of the curator is to reveal the artist's work at the moment of its relevance and to give it context, and not just to give validity to art from the past.

=== Between "new horizons" and post-minimalist art ===
The group of post-minimalist artists was one of the main groups that Fisher supported during the 1970s. Fisher's inclination towards experimental art led him to be one of the main factors in promoting this trend in Israel. The exhibition "Concept + Information" (1971), curated by the Israel Museum, was the first public exposure of this art in Israel. According to Mordechai Omer, this group of artists managed to establish "the first important movement that arose after 'Ofakim Hadashim' and was able to".

Alongside his ongoing ties with the artists of both groups, Fischer encouraged the activities of artists who bridged these two movements. The early influence can be found in the presentation of the various stages of the "Eagle Quarry Restoration Project" (1971) by Yitzhak Danziger at the Israel Museum. Danziger, who at that time moved away from the abstract sculpture that characterized his work in the 1950s and 1960s, formulated his later work as an expression of artistic work processes and as an attempt to redefine the relationship between art and nature. These brought Danziger closer to a number of young artists such as Avital Geva, Micah Ullman, Moshe Gershoni and others. An example of this influence can be found in the "Metzer-Messer Project" (1972), initiated by this group.

Another connection was created around the presentation of the work of Arie Aroch, whose influence grew more and more acute during the decade. "The conversation between Fisher and Arie Aroch", wrote Shva Salhoov, "creates a story that is linked to and has been made into art since the seventies".[19] In presenting the works of Aroch, a painter who was a marginal member of "New Horizons", Fischer proposed to perceive the work as a pictorial expression of cultural and historical markers. Instead of a formal analysis, Long was presented as a figure who separated Israeli art from European abstraction and introduced into it the influences of contemporary pop art. In this way, Fisher was able to mediate Aroch's work into the generation of conceptual art. In this regard, works such as the "Zakfar" series (1961–1966), and the discussion that led to the concept of "abstract-concrete" developed by Aroch, as well as the painting "High Commissioner" (1964) and "Agrippa Street" (1964), and the transformation of the "common image " in which to a "form" that detaches itself from literary and biographical contexts, constitute a peak in the formation of this perception.

=== Kupferman and the "language" of painting ===
In the second half of the 1980s, and especially in the exhibition catalogue "Painting in the Light of the Mediterranean" (1987) that Fischer initiated and one of its curators, he formulated for the first time a "Mediterranean" concept of colour. This concept, which Fischer did not develop, was based on the colour purple and its tonality. "The white, the black and the purple in the order of their number," Fisher wrote in the catalogue of the exhibition, "are the colors of the distribution and radiation of all radiations and of the edge of the visible border. These colours are the colours of the desire to paint in undefined illuminated areas where the light overwhelms the shadow, eliminating volumes and obscuring distances." Template: check quote This perception also permeated Fischer's view of modern painting, especially regarding the work of Moshe Kupferman.

Kupferman's working relationship with Fischer was long and significant during both of their artistic careers. Their beginnings were in the second half of the 60s of the 20th century, when Fischer met Kupferman's work on a tour he did with Sandberg. In 1969, Fischer curated the first museum solo exhibition for Kupferman at the Israel Museum. In 1984, the exhibition "Moshe Kupferman: Paintings, Works on Paper" was presented at the museum.

The concept of art of Kupferman's works, which Fischer sought to establish, emphasized the artistic work process through the work processes of drawing and erasing. In this way, his work connected both to the abstract art after "New Horizons" and to the post-minimalist trends of the 70s. This view, which places "language" at its centre, had to deal repeatedly, as Fischer himself testified, with the prevailing tendency to try to identify figurative elements in Kupferman's work.

Initiated and promoted the establishment of the municipal square named after the artist "Abshalom" in Ashdod.
