= Joshua Zarka =

Israeli diplomat

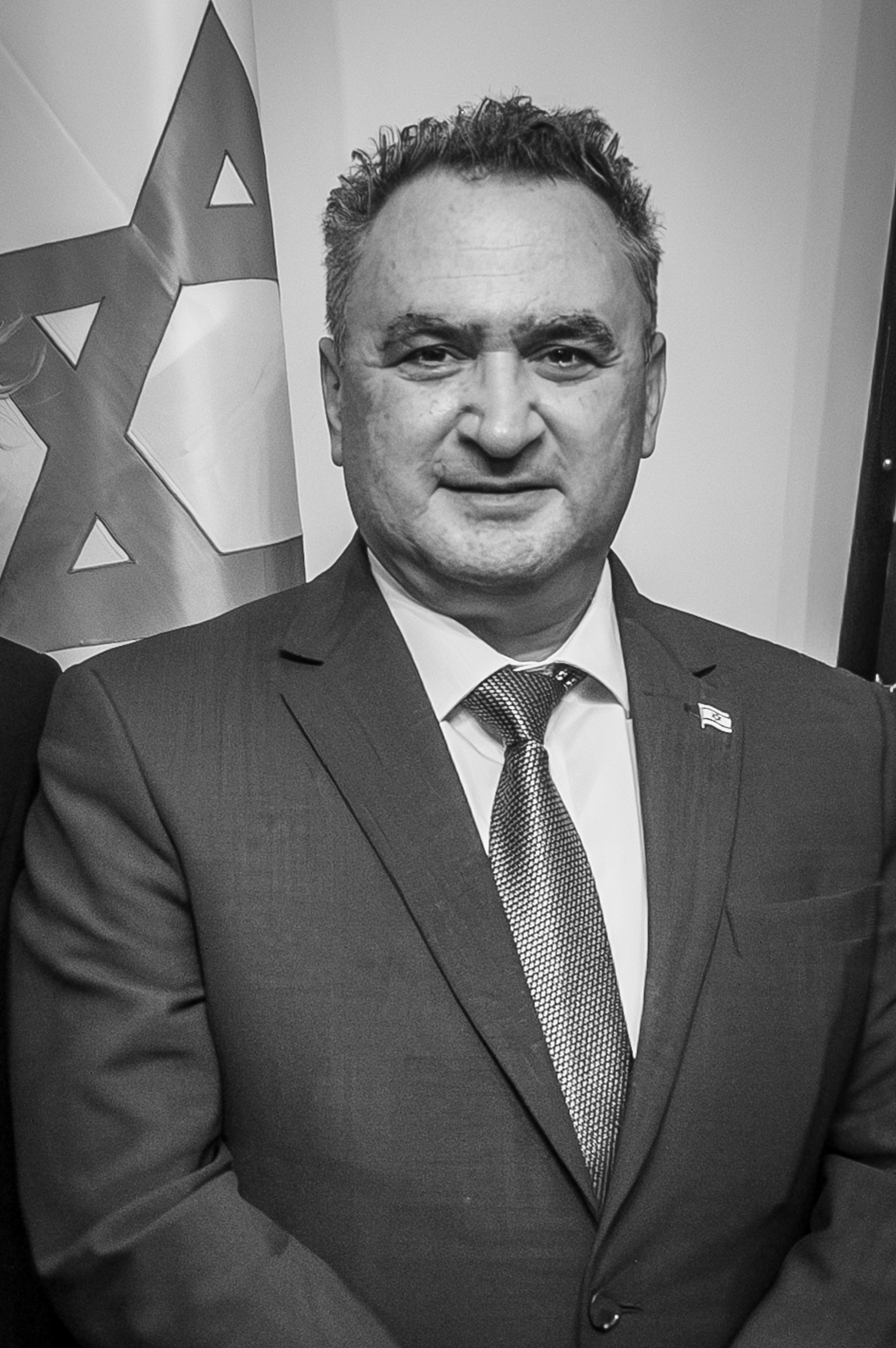
Joshua Laurent Zarka (2025) by Claude Truong-Ngoc

Joshua Laurent Zarka (born 1964) is an Israeli diplomat known for his extensive diplomatic service and his role in fostering Israel's relations with various nations, including the United States, Russia and China. He is currently the Israeli ambassador to France. He previously served as the Deputy Director General for Strategic Affairs at the Ministry of Foreign Affairs of Israel.

== Early life and education ==
Joshua Zarka is born in Paris in 1964 from a family of Tunisian immigrants. They immigrated to Israel (Jerusalem) in 1975. He then pursued higher education, earning a Bachelor of Arts in Economics and History from the Hebrew University and a master's degree in political science from the University of Haifa. Zarka is also a graduate of the Israeli National Defense College.

== Career ==
Zarka started his career as an economist at the Israeli Ministry of Finance before starting his diplomatic career.

His diplomatic career includes roles such as Deputy Director General for Strategic Affairs at the Ministry of Foreign Affairs of Israel since July 2018. Prior to this, he served as Director of the North American Bureau from August 2015 to July 2018 and as Minister at the Embassy of Israel to the US between August 2011 and August 2015. He was also the Special Envoy of the Foreign Minister to Bahrain from March 2009 to August 2011.

Zarka has contributed to the security of Israel and the world, through his involvement with the International Institute for Counter-Terrorism (ICT), where he has hosted and participated in several panels.

Zarka has participated in high-level exchanges with multiple countries, emphasizing arms control and non-proliferation:

- In Russia, he was involved in consultations on security matters with Deputy Foreign Minister Sergey Ryabkov
- In China, he co-held a consultation on arms control and nonproliferation with Director-General Fu Cong of the Foreign Ministry's Department of Arms Control
- As a key Israeli representative, Zarka hosted the Wassenaar Arrangement (WA) outreach visit in Israel in November 2019, focusing on the export controls for conventional arms and dual-use goods and technologies

As an expert on Iranian nuclear issues, Zarka has been integral in representing Israel's stance during critical nuclear talks. His efforts in Vienna in 2022 and insights shared in a "Le Monde" interview in 2021 highlight his deep understanding and strategic approach to the complexities of Iran's nuclear program and the geopolitical dynamics of the region

In 2023 Zarka was nominated to be Israel's ambassador to France. He assumed the position in May 2024. With the 2024 Olympics happening in Paris, Zarka spoke at a memorial honoring the Israeli athletes killed at the 1972 Munich Olympics.

In 2015, U.S. Representative Mark Meadows formally recognized Joshua Zarka's work as the Minister for Congressional Affairs at the Israeli Embassy in Washington, D.C. As Deputy Director General of the Foreign Ministry, Head of Strategic Affairs, Zarka met number of foreign delegations or represented Israel overseas.

== Personal life ==
Fluent in Hebrew, English, and French, Zarka is a father to four children.
