= Prix Montaigne de Bordeaux =

French literary prize

The Prix Montaigne de Bordeaux is a literary prize created in 2003 by the Bordeaux Wine Academy and the city of Bordeaux. It is attributed to a work that represents the values of humanism, tolerance and liberty that were dear to writer and philosopher Michel de Montaigne, who was Bordeaux's mayor from 1581 to 1585.

== Laureates ==
- 2003 : Philippe Sollers. Illuminations à travers les textes sacrés. Robert Laffont.
- 2004 : Jacques Julliard. Le Choix de Pascal. Desclée de Brouwer.
- 2005 : Michel Winock. La France et les juifs, de 1789 à nos jours. Seuil.
- 2006 : Thérèse Delpech. L'Ensauvagement. Grasset.
- 2007 : Pascal Bruckner. La Tyrannie de la pénitence: Essai sur le masochisme occidental. Grasset.
- 2008 : Philippe Beaussant. Passages: De la Renaissance au Baroque. Fayard.
- 2009 : Élie Barnavi. L'Europe frigide: Réflexions sur un projet inachevé. André Versaille.
- 2010 : Mona Ozouf. Composition française: Retour sur une enfance bretonne. Gallimard.
- 2011 : Laurent Fabius. Le Cabinet des douze : Regards sur des tableaux qui font la France. Gallimard.
- 2012 : Pierre Nora. Historien public. Gallimard. (ainsi que pour l’ensemble de son œuvre)
- 2013 : Jean-Pierre Le Goff. La Fin du village: Une histoire française. Gallimard.
- 2014 : Philippe Raynaud. La Politesse des lumières: Les lois, les mœurs, les manières. Gallimard.
- 2015 : Régis Debray. Un candide à sa fenêtre. Dégagements II. Gallimard.
- 2016 : Éric Roussel. François Mitterrand. De l'intime au politique. Robert Laffont.
- 2017 : Patrice Gueniffey. Napoléon et De Gaulle. Deux héros français. Perrin.
- 2018 : Philippe Sands. Retour à Lemberg. Albin Michel.
- 2019 : Jean Birnbaum, La Religion des faibles. Ce que le djihadisme dit de nous, Seuil
- 2020 : Michel Pastoureau, Jaune. Histoire d'une couleur, Seuil
- 2021 : François Azouvi, Français, on ne vous a rien caché : la Résistance, Vichy, notre mémoire, Gallimard
