= Aliza Bin-Noun =

Israeli diplomat

- עליזה בן-נון
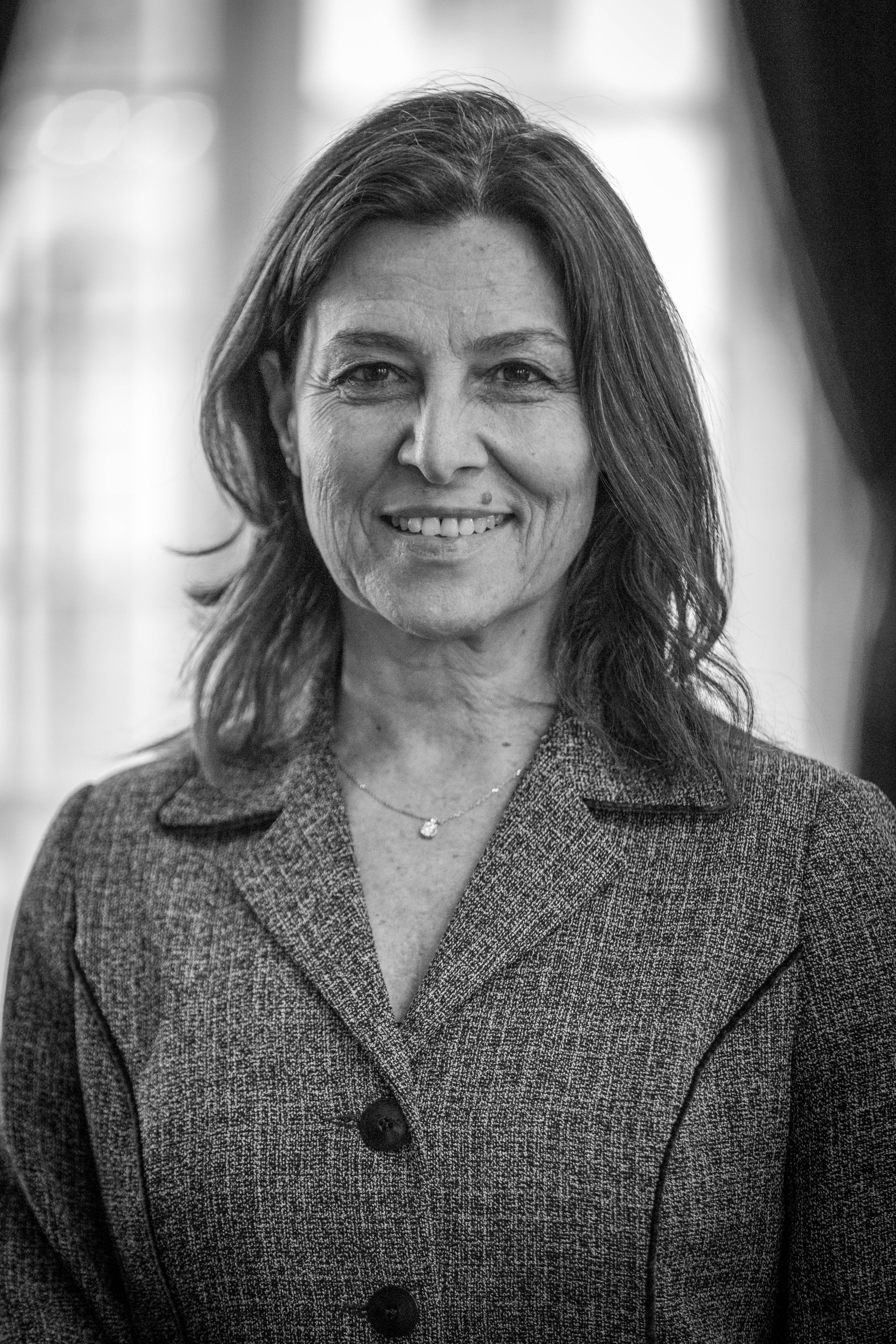
- Ambassador Aliza Bin-Noun in March 2016
- Education: Hebrew University of Jerusalem
- Occupation: Diplomat
- Spouse: Claus Bin-Noun
- Children: 2 daughters

Aliza Bin-Noun (Hebrew: עליזה בן-נון) is an Israeli diplomat. She serves as the Israeli Ambassador to France and Monaco.

== Biography ==
Aliza Bin-Noun grew up near Nahariya, in northern Israel. Her Hungarian paternal grandparents were deported to the Auschwitz concentration camp during World War II. Her father is a Holocaust survivor.

Bin-Noun graduated from the Hebrew University of Jerusalem, where she studied French. She served in the Israel Defense Forces. Bin-Noun is married to Claus, with whom she has two daughters.

== Diplomatic career ==
Bin-Noun is a career diplomat. From 2001 to 2006, she was Advisor in the Arms Control Division, followed by Advisor in Political Affairs, and Director of Department of Coordination Bureau. She served as Israel's ambassador in Budapest, Hungary from 2007 to 2011. In 2012, she was appointed as the Head of the Political Bureau in the Israeli Ministry of Foreign Affairs.

Since August 2015, Bin-Noun has served as the Israeli Ambassador to France. She is the first female Israeli ambassador to France. Since December 2015, Bin-Noun has also served as the Israeli Ambassador to Monaco.

== See also ==
- Women of Israel
