= Élie Barnavi =

Israeli historian and diplomat

- אלי בר-נביא
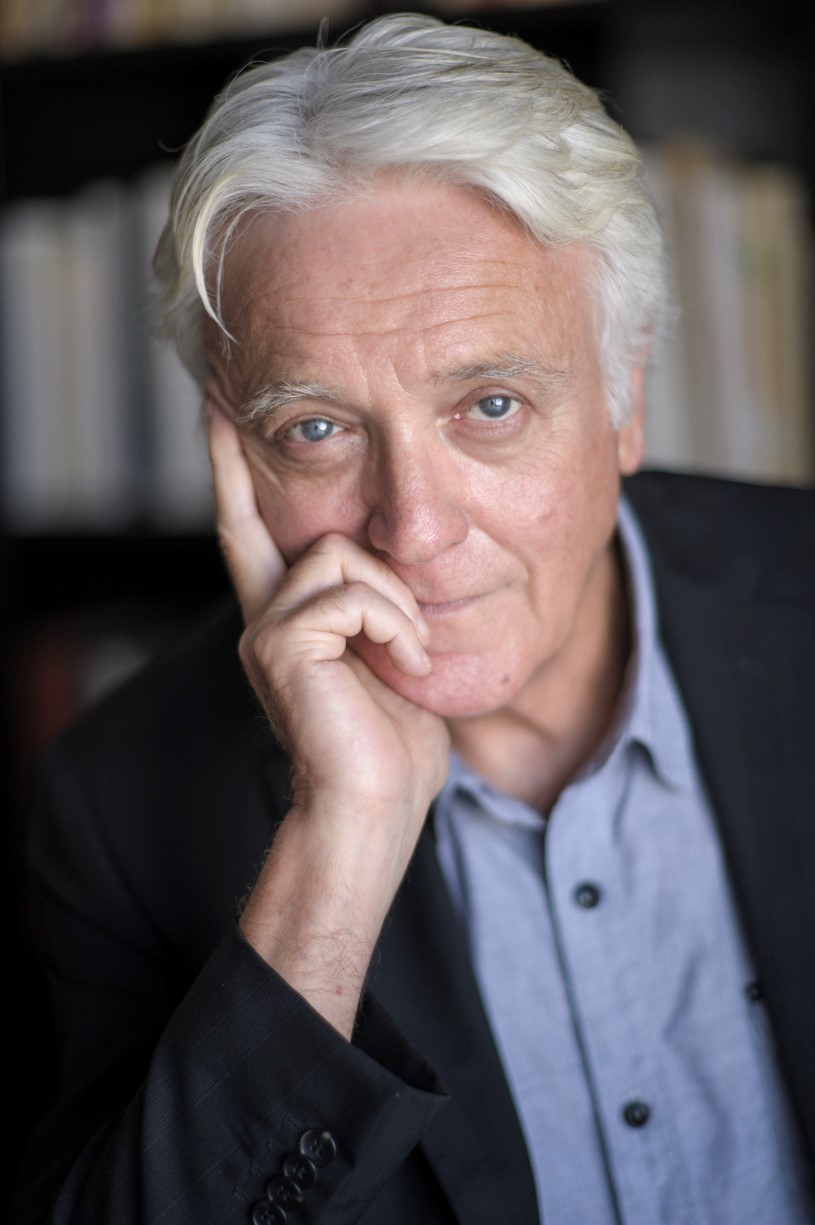
- Élie Barnavi (2009)
- Born: 1946 (age 79–80); Bucharest, Romania
- Occupations: Historian, essayist, diplomat
- Awards: Grand prix de la Francophonie de l’Académie française, Prix Montaigne de Bordeaux, Prix Aujourd’hui

Élie Barnavi (Hebrew: אלי בר-נביא; born 1946) is an Israeli historian and diplomat, who was the Israeli ambassador to France between 2000 and 2002. Born in Bucharest, he moved as a child to Tel Aviv, Israel. He authored some fifteen books on France and Europe in the turmoil of the Religious Wars and on the contemporary history of Israel and of the Jewish people. He published numerous studies in professional journals in Europe, the US and Canada, as well as political articles in the Israeli and European press.

== Biography ==
Born in Bucharest, Romania, Barnavi emigrated as a child to Tel Aviv and became an Israeli citizen. He has degrees in history, and in political science from Tel Aviv University (TAU), and received his PhD in modern history from the University of Paris in 1971, after which he was appointed professor of modern Western history at TAU, where he headed the Department of General History and the Center for International Studies. He became the science director of the Museum of Europe in Brussels in 1998, and was the Israeli ambassador to France between 2000 and 2002, after which he resumed teaching at TAU and returned to his work at the museum.

Barnavi is an advocate for peace in the Israeli–Palestinian conflict, and for the creation of a Palestinian state. He was a member of the Peace Now movement, the Israeli Labor Party and left-wing-liberal Meretz party. In June 2008 he wrote an article in Marianne magazine regarding the Muhammad al-Durrah incident, which involved a 12-year-old Palestinian boy who was supposedly shot dead. He criticised the actions of Talal Abu Rahma—the Palestinian cameraman freelancing for France 2 who filmed the footage, calling him a "propagandist in the service of the Palestinian cause"—France 2, and Charles Enderlin, France 2's bureau chief in Israel; and called for an independent inquiry into the affair. Enderlin replied that, given Barnavi's position as a former ambassador, a quick call to Shabak, Israel's internal security service, would have cleared up inaccuracies in his account. In 2010 he helped create JCall and supported its "Call for Reason" campaign which advocates the two-state solution.

Barnavi was friends with Jean Frydman, a member of the French Resistance, and successfully persuaded Frydman to write an autobiography after Romain Gary among others tried and failed. He has debated with Hubert Védrine, amongst others.

Barnavi has written several books on French and European history, including L’Europe Frigide ("Frigid Europe") (2008), in which he talks about how "Europe no longer incites passion in her citizens. She has lost her sex appeal, is no longer exciting or arousing curiosity, since everything has become bureaucratic." In 2010 he said the European Union was in decline relative to the United States and emerging countries.
