= List of ambassadors of Israel to Monaco =

== List of ambassadors ==
- Aliza Bin-Noun
- Yossi Gal 2010-2015

=== Former Heads of Mission ===
- Consul General Benad Avital (Non-Resident, Marseille) 1979 - 1982
- Consul General Shimon Avimor (Non-Resident, Marseille) 1976 - 1979
