= Yossi Gal =

Israeli diplomat

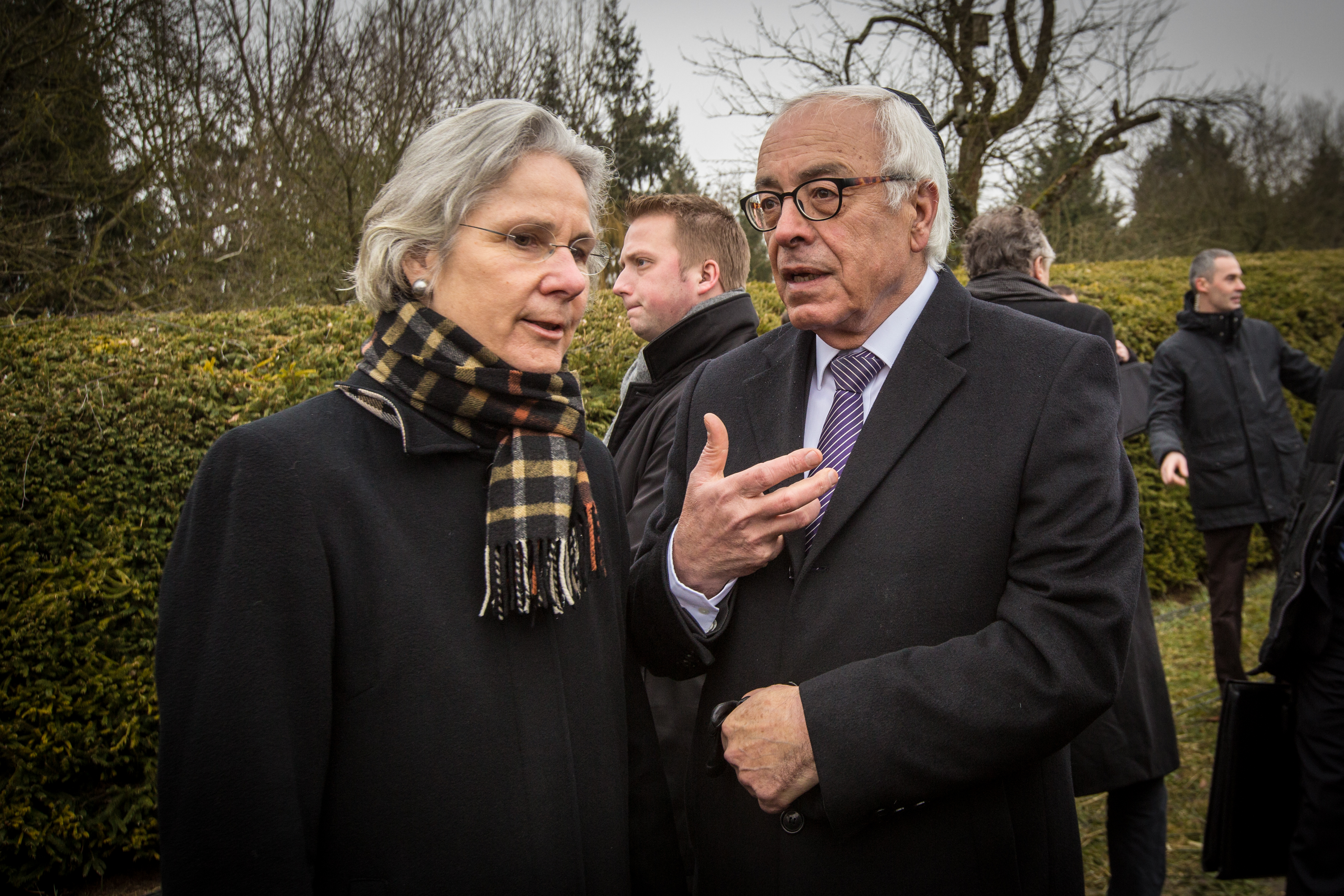
Susanne Wasum-Rainer with Israel's ambassador to France Yossi Gal in Sarre-Union, February 2015.

Yossi Gal (Hebrew: יוסי גל) is the Vice President for University Advancement and External Relations for the Hebrew University of Jerusalem (from which he graduated) and was the Israeli Ambassador to France and Monaco from 2010 until 2015. He also served as Ambassador to the Netherlands from 1995 until 2001.

As Director General of Economic Affairs, he "fostered Israel's accession to the OECD and strengthened ties between the country and the European Union. From 1991 to 1995, he also contributed to the bilateral peace negotiations between Palestinians and Jordanians as spokesman of the Israeli delegation."

== Awards and honors ==
- in 2016, France named him as a Commander of the Legion of Honour.
