= Independence Hall (Israel) =

Building in Tel Aviv, Israel

Coordinates: 32°3′46″N 34°46′15″E

- בית דיזנגוף
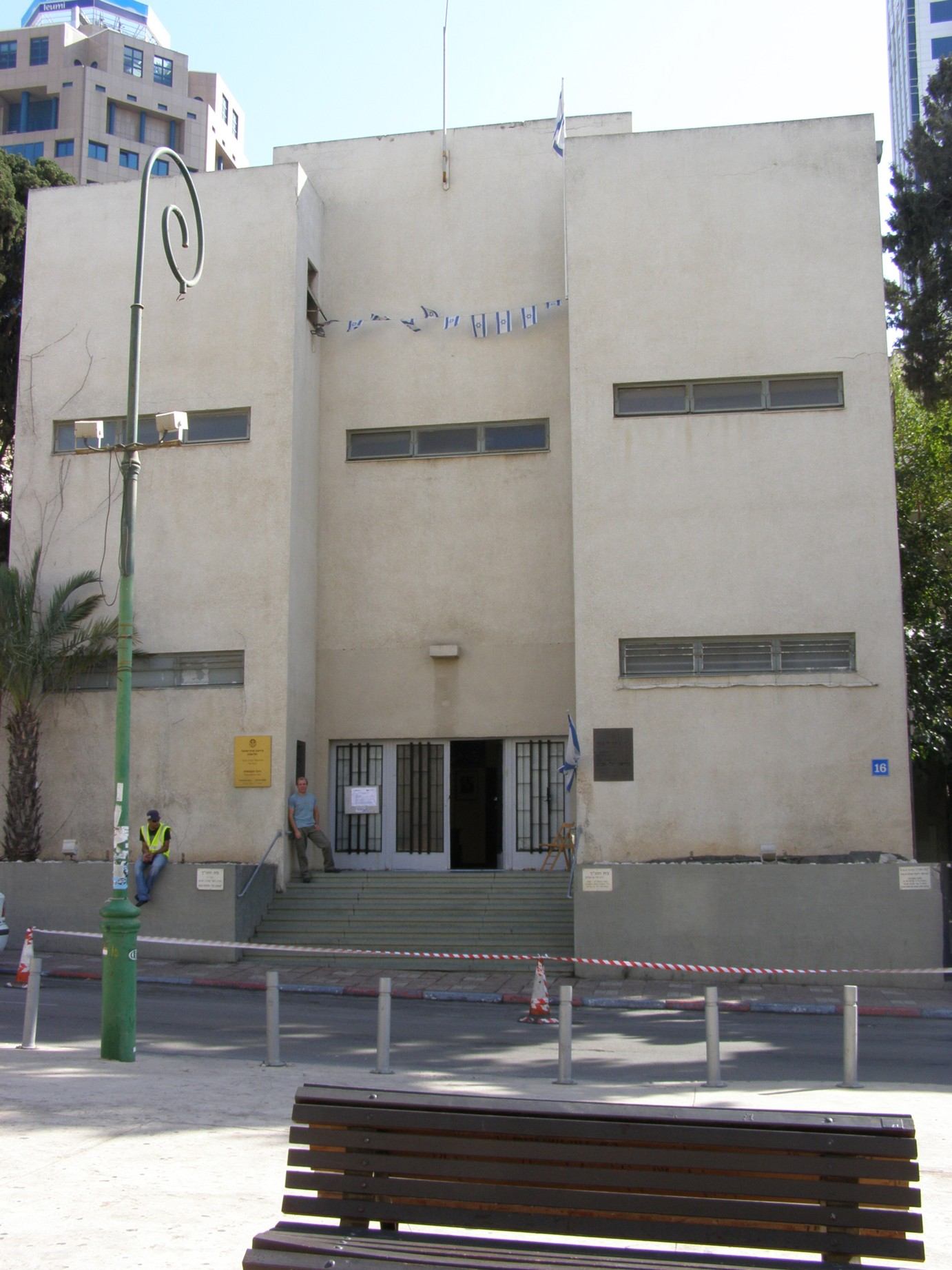
- Israel's Independence Hall, 16 Rothschild Boulevard, Tel Aviv, 2007
- Interactive map of the Independence Hall area
- Alternative names: Dizengoff House

General information
- Status: Completed
- Type: Museum
- Location: 16 Rothschild Boulevard, Tel Aviv, Israel
- Renovated: 1978

Design and construction
- Architect: Carl Rubin
- Known for: Site of the signing of Israel's Declaration of Independence

Independence Hall, originally the Dizengoff House (Hebrew: בית דיזנגוף), is a history museum and the site of the signing of Israel's Declaration of Independence. It is located on the historic Rothschild Boulevard in Tel Aviv, Israel.

It was originally built as the home of Meir Dizengoff and his wife Zina. Dizengoff later entrusted architect Carl Rubin to redesign the building in the International Style. Dizengoff gifted the building to the Tel Aviv-Yafo Municipality, and it housed the Tel Aviv Museum of Art from 1932 to 1971. It is currently a museum dedicated to the signing of the Israeli Declaration of Independence and the history of Tel Aviv; as of 2024 it is closed to the public for renovations.

== History ==
=== Dizengoff ===
At the vicinity of where Independence Hall now stands, sixty-six families gathered on April 11, 1909, to conduct a lottery for plots of land in a new Jewish neighborhood, to be known as Ahuzat Bayit. Meir and Zina Dizengoff acquired plot number 43, on which they built their home. It was originally a simple and symmetrical house, built of kurkar stone.

Meir Dizengoff served as the head of the new neighborhood council. In 1910, at a general meeting, the residents of Ahuzat Bayit, inspired by Theodor Herzl's Altneuland (English: Old-New Land), unanimously decided to rename their neighborhood Tel Aviv. As the neighborhood grew and became a city, Dizengoff became its first mayor. Zina was a socialite and hosted European-style salon gatherings at the home.

Dizengoff made several renovations to the property, including the addition of a rear wing where the declaration of independence took place. Dizengoff hired the architect, Carl Rubin, who redesigned the building in the international style.

=== Tel Aviv Museum of Art ===
In 1930, after the death of his wife, Dizengoff donated his house to his beloved city of Tel Aviv and requested that it be turned into a museum. The house underwent extensive renovations and became the Tel Aviv Museum of Art in 1932. In 1933, the museum hired the art historian, Dr. Karl Schwarz to head the burgeoning museum. Schwarz immigrated to Mandatory Palestine to take up the position, leaving behind his role as head of Berlin's first Jewish museum. At the time of his appointment he wrote a guest column for Haaretz newspaper, setting out his vision for the museum: "A nurturing institution, from which education will emerge, reflecting the artistic development in other countries; where one can study the works of the country's great artists; [and] which fosters and provides for artists living and working in the country—a place where new ideas are given impetus. That is what the Tel Aviv Museum should be." He stayed on with the museum until 1947, enhancing the art collection, preparing exhibitions and creating a library for the history of art and cinema.The museum moved to its current location at 27 Shaul Hamelech Blvd, in 1971. The larger, purpose-built building was more appropriate and allowed the museum to expand.

=== Independence declaration ===
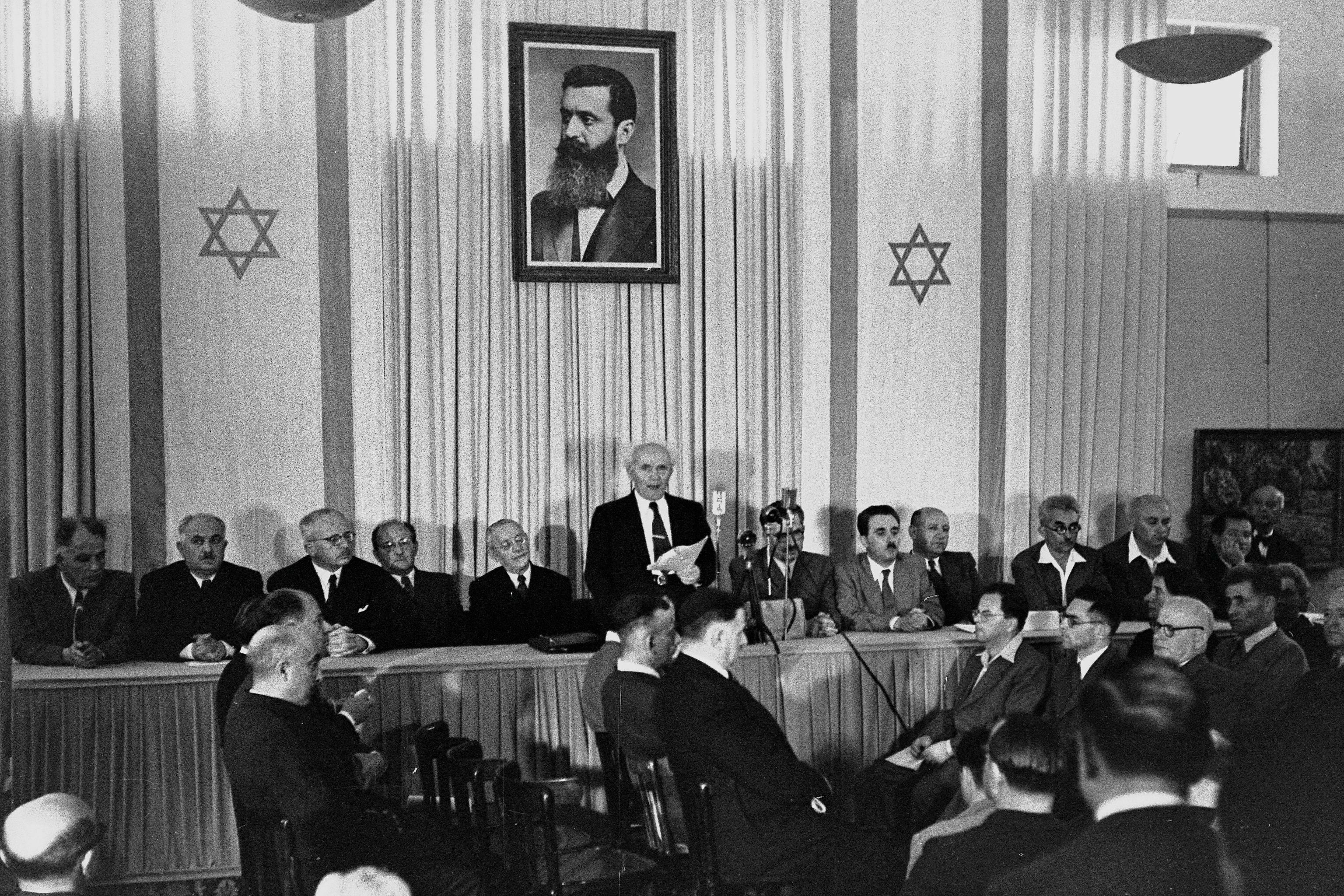
David Ben-Gurion pronouncing Israel's Declaration of Independence, May 14, 1948

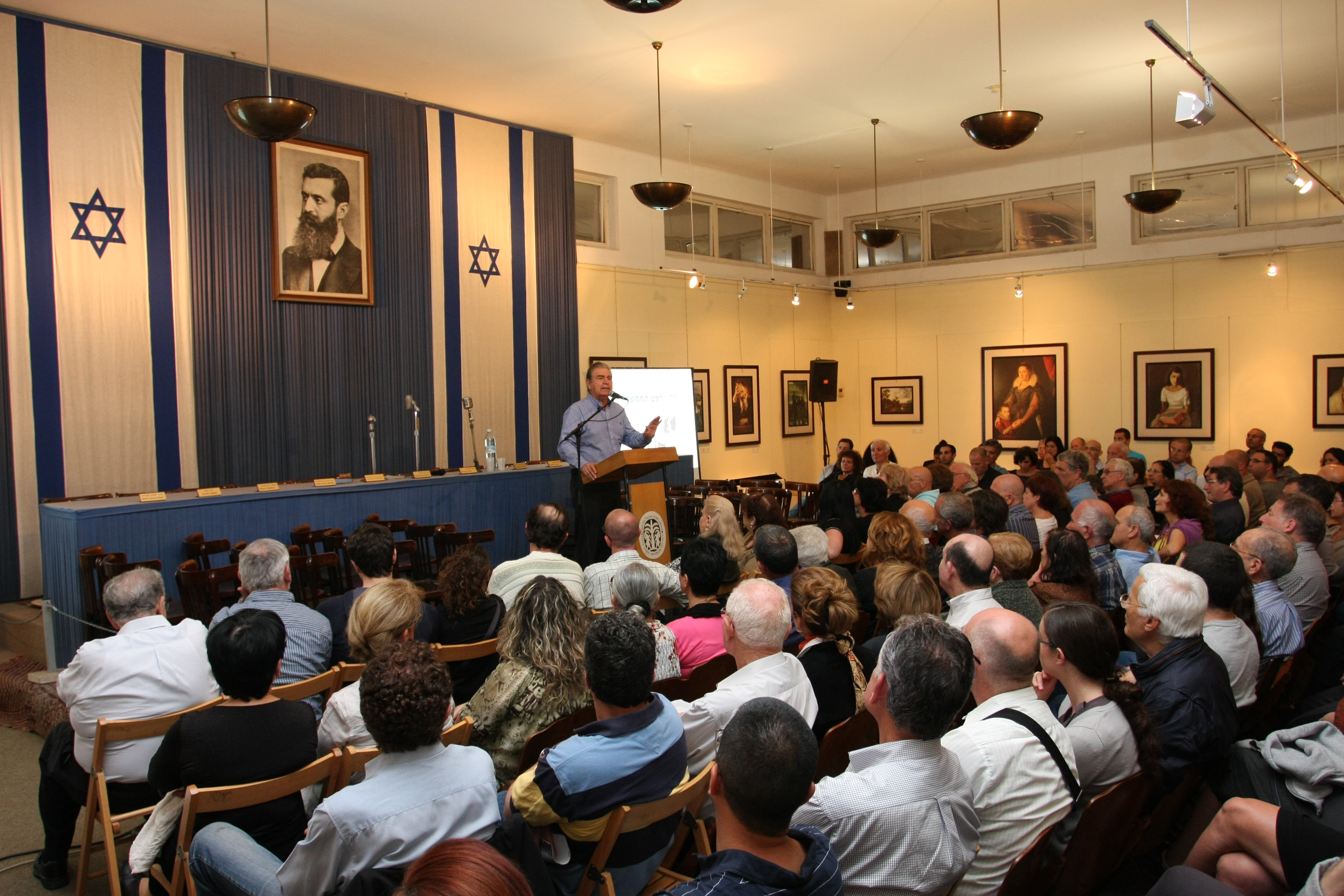
Michael Bar-Zohar, Ben Gurion's biographer, lecturing in the restored main hall, 2012

In the main hall of the building, at 4 PM on May 14, 1948 (5 Iyar 5708), in the presence of the members of the Vaad Leumi (Jewish National Council) and the leaders of the Yishuv, David Ben-Gurion proclaimed the establishment of the State of Israel, eight hours before the British Mandate of Palestine was due to end. After Ben-Gurion read the Declaration of Independence, Rabbi Fischman (Maimon) recited the Shehecheyanu blessing, and the Declaration was signed. The ceremony concluded with the singing of Hatikvah, now Israel's national anthem.

In the 24 hours prior to the ceremony, considerable efforts were made to prepare the hall. A $200 budget was allocated for the decor and decorations, and Israeli flags were loaned from the Jewish National Fund. Seating for the audiences was also provided by nearby cafes. A small stage was also constructed, made from timber purchases at a thrift store. A portrait of Theodor Herzl was also hung in a central position above the stage. Art works portraying nudity were covered, carpets were laid on the floors and windows were darkened over fears of an air raid. The invited guests were sworn to secrecy and the art museum was closed to the public during these preparations. In spite of the pact of secrecy, a crowd formed outside the building at noon on the day of the ceremony. The declaration and celebrations were photographed by Rudi Weissenstein.

=== Recent history ===
By the 1970s, the building was in a neglected physical state, crumbling and with mice problems. In 1978, the hall was restored to resemble its appearance at the time of the declaration of independence and opened to the public. It has since been a museum dedicated to the signing of the declaration and the history of Tel Aviv-Yafo. The upper floors of the building have housed a Bible museum, featuring archaeological artifacts and works of art with biblical themes.

However, as the surrounding Rothschild Boulevard underwent a revival, and neighboring properties were restored, the hall appeared shabby and rundown in the 1990s and 2000s. In 2009, the "Independence House Law" was enacted to "restore and preserve the building [...] as it is of national and historical importance in the history of the people and the state." Urgent renovations on the building were undertaken by architect Uri Glazer in 2012. During these works, a ceramic relief by German-born Israeli artist, Chava Samuel was discovered behind a board.

In 2013, it was revealed that the building was earmarked for a major renovation project in the coming years, creating an "innovative museum" in the space. The building is currently closed to the public as it undergoes these extensive renovations. Glazer and Gal & Matsliah Architects won a design competition to restore the building and are being assisted by the engineer, Moshe Kazes.

== Gallery ==
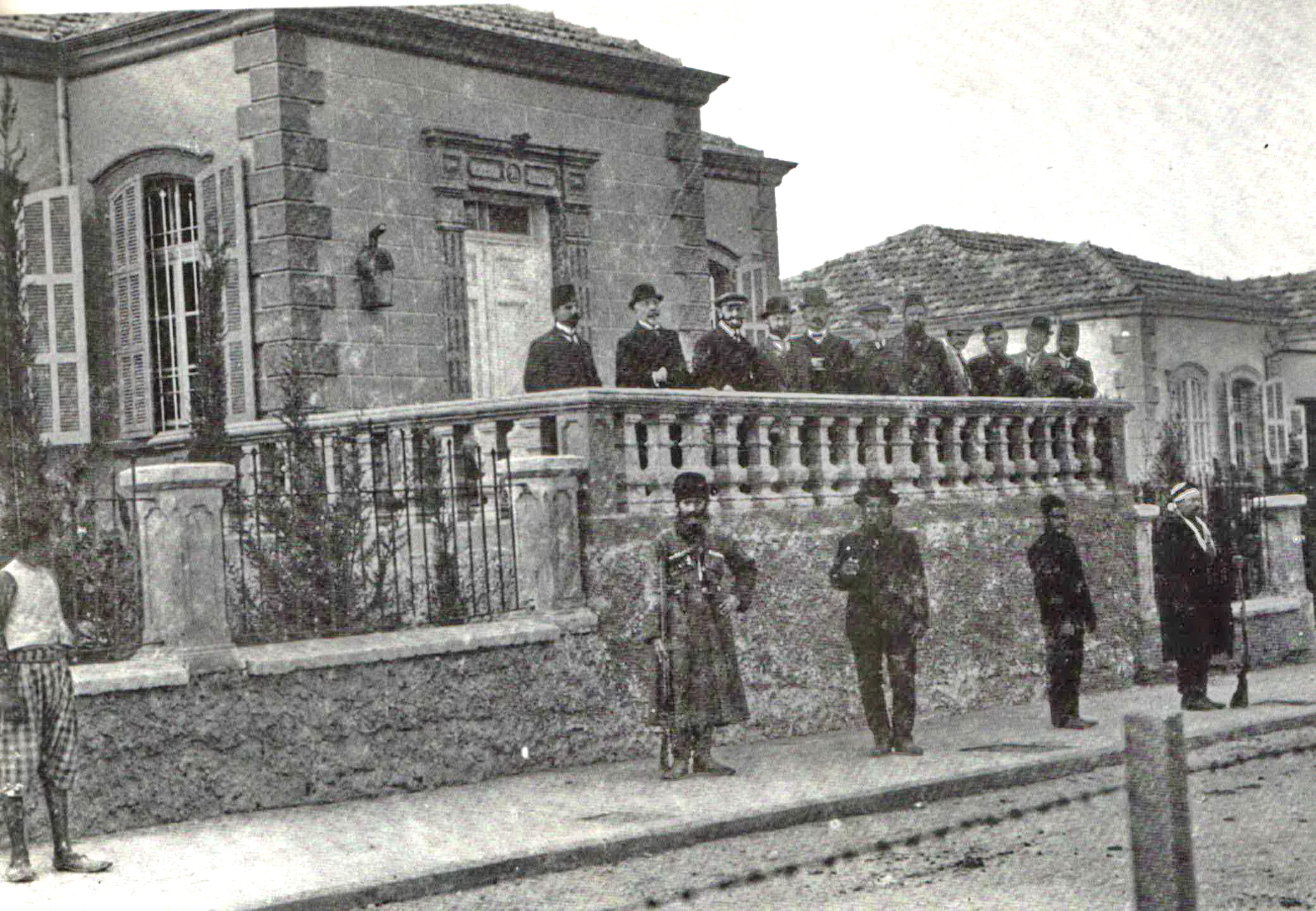
16 Rothschild Boulevard (Dizengoff House), home of Meir and Zina Dizengoff, in 1910, Dershowitz collection

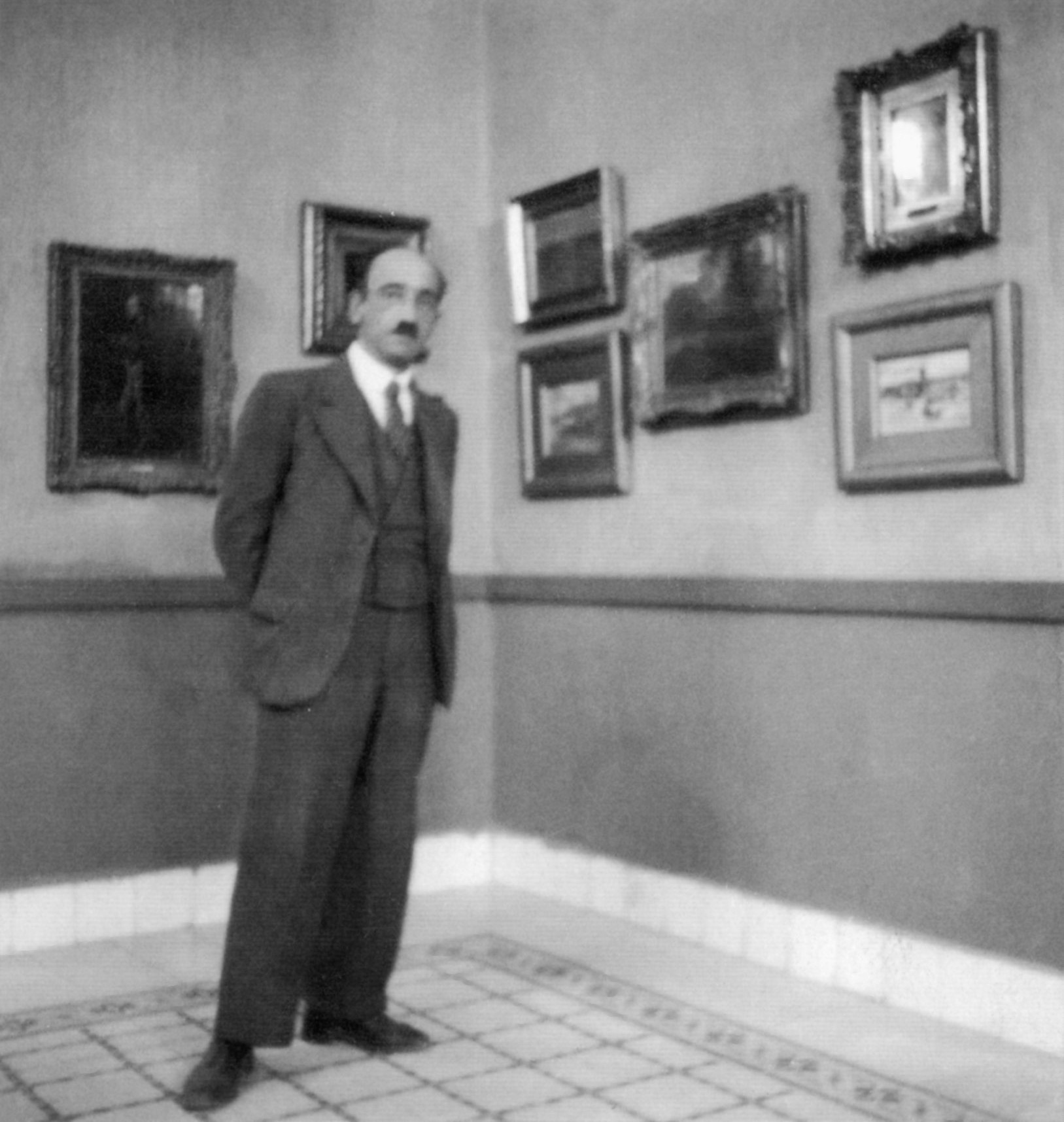
Art historian, Dr. Karl Schwarz, who headed TA Museum of Art, 1935

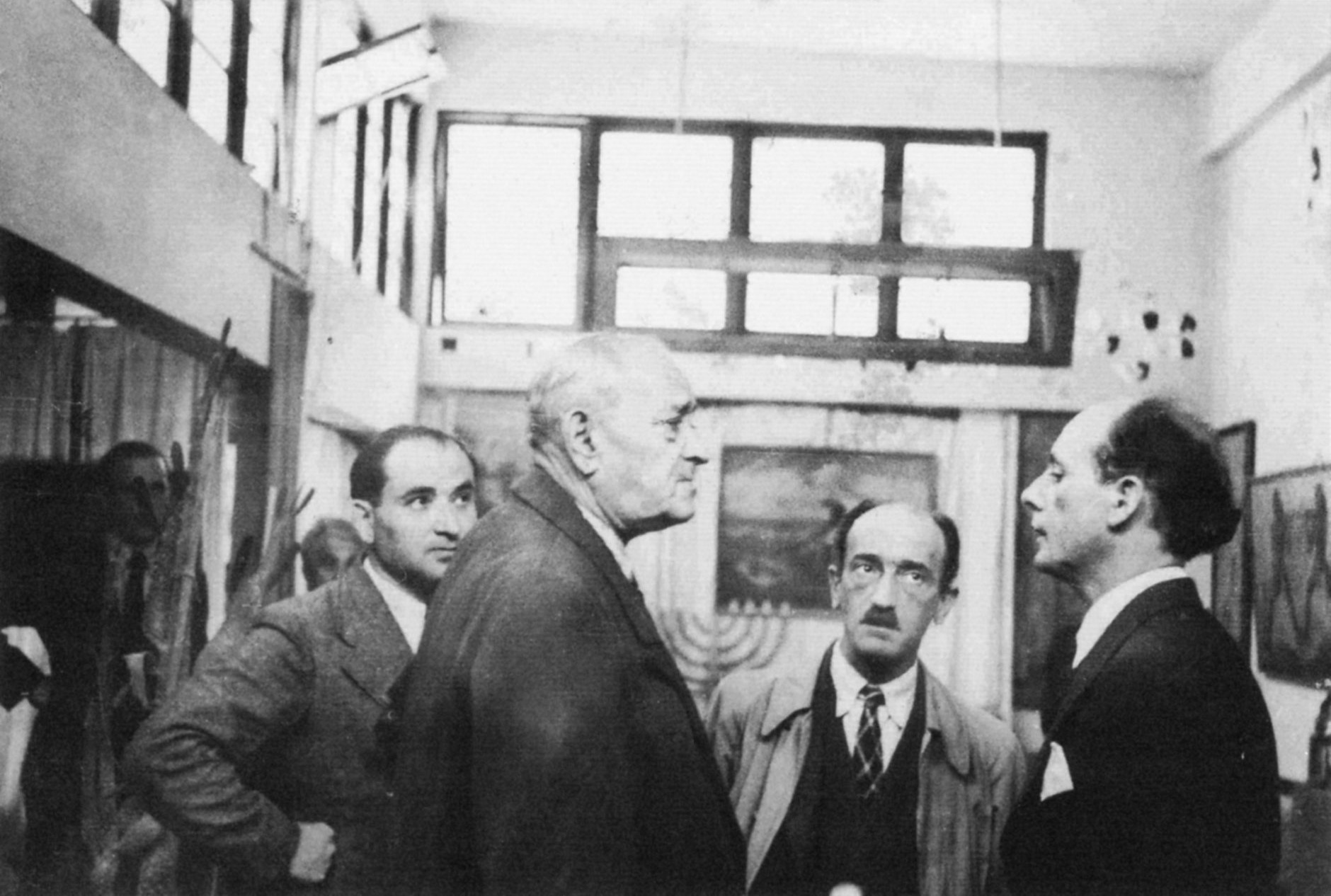
Dr. Karl Schwarz at Tel Aviv Art Museum in 1935

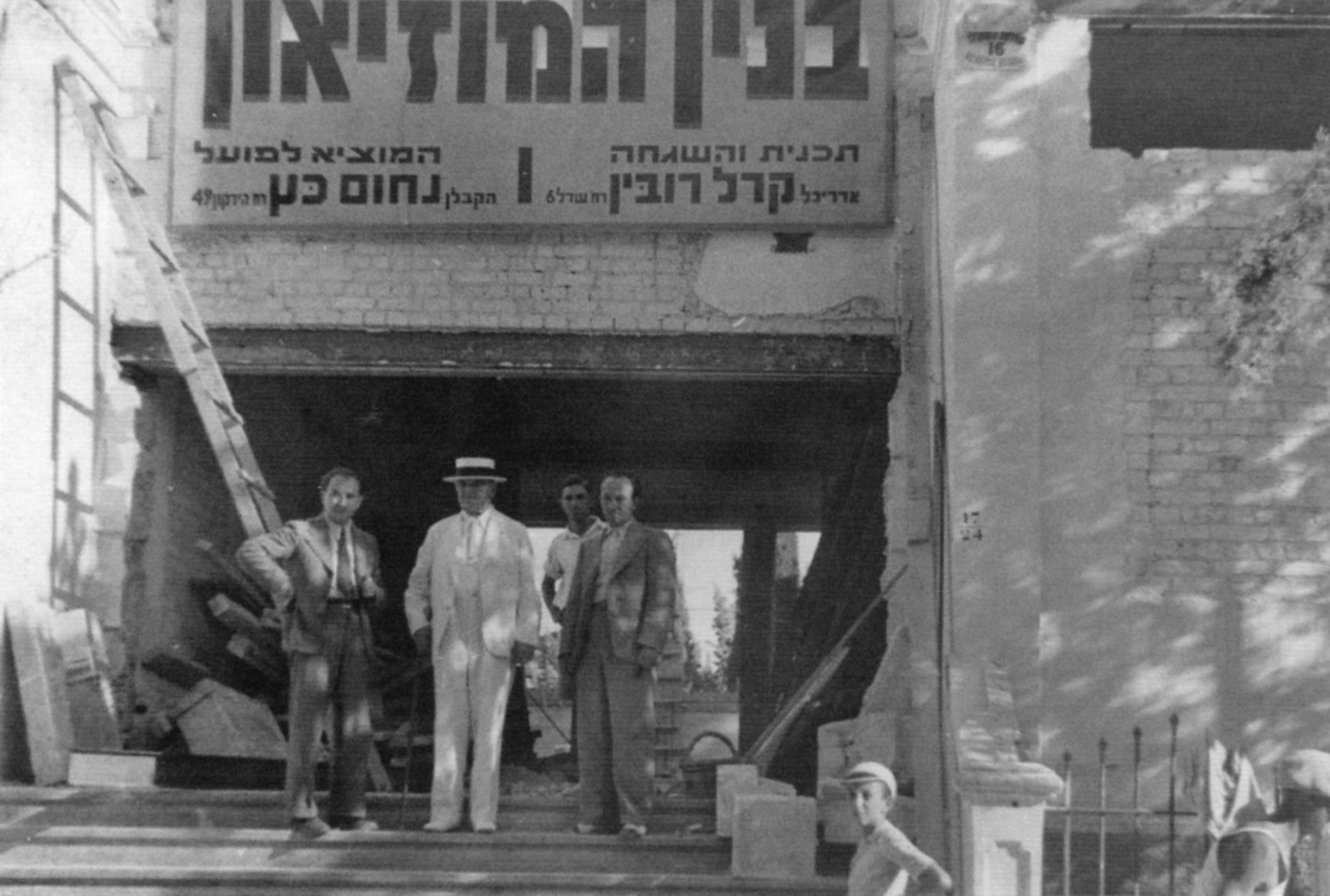
Carl Rubin, Meir Dizengoff and Moshe Kaniuk during the renovation of the Tel Aviv Museum, 1935, Meir Dizengoff Collection, Eretz Israel Museum.

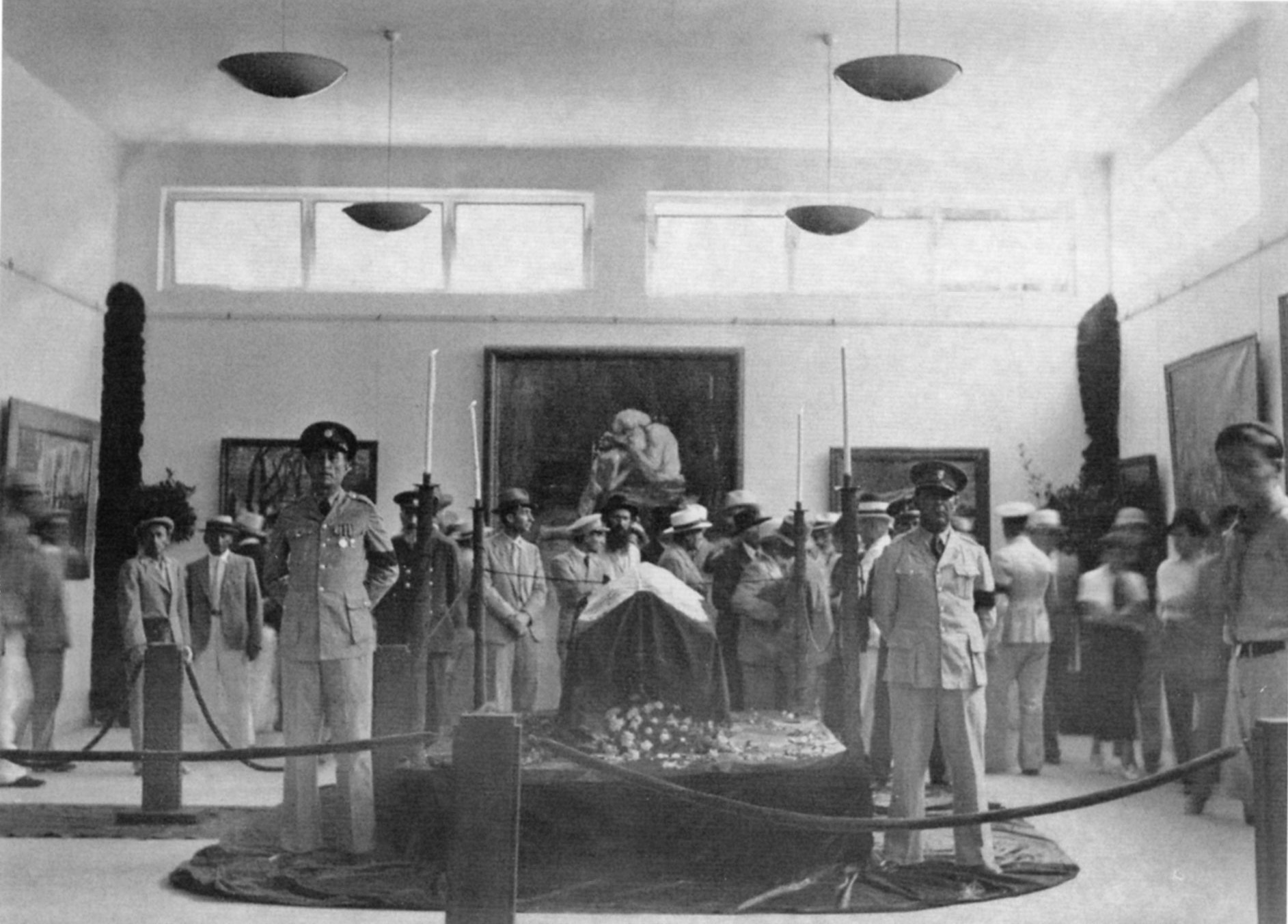
Walter Tzedek, Meir Dizengoff's coffin placed in the Tel Aviv Museum, September 24, 1936. Meir Dizengoff Collection, Eretz Israel Museum.

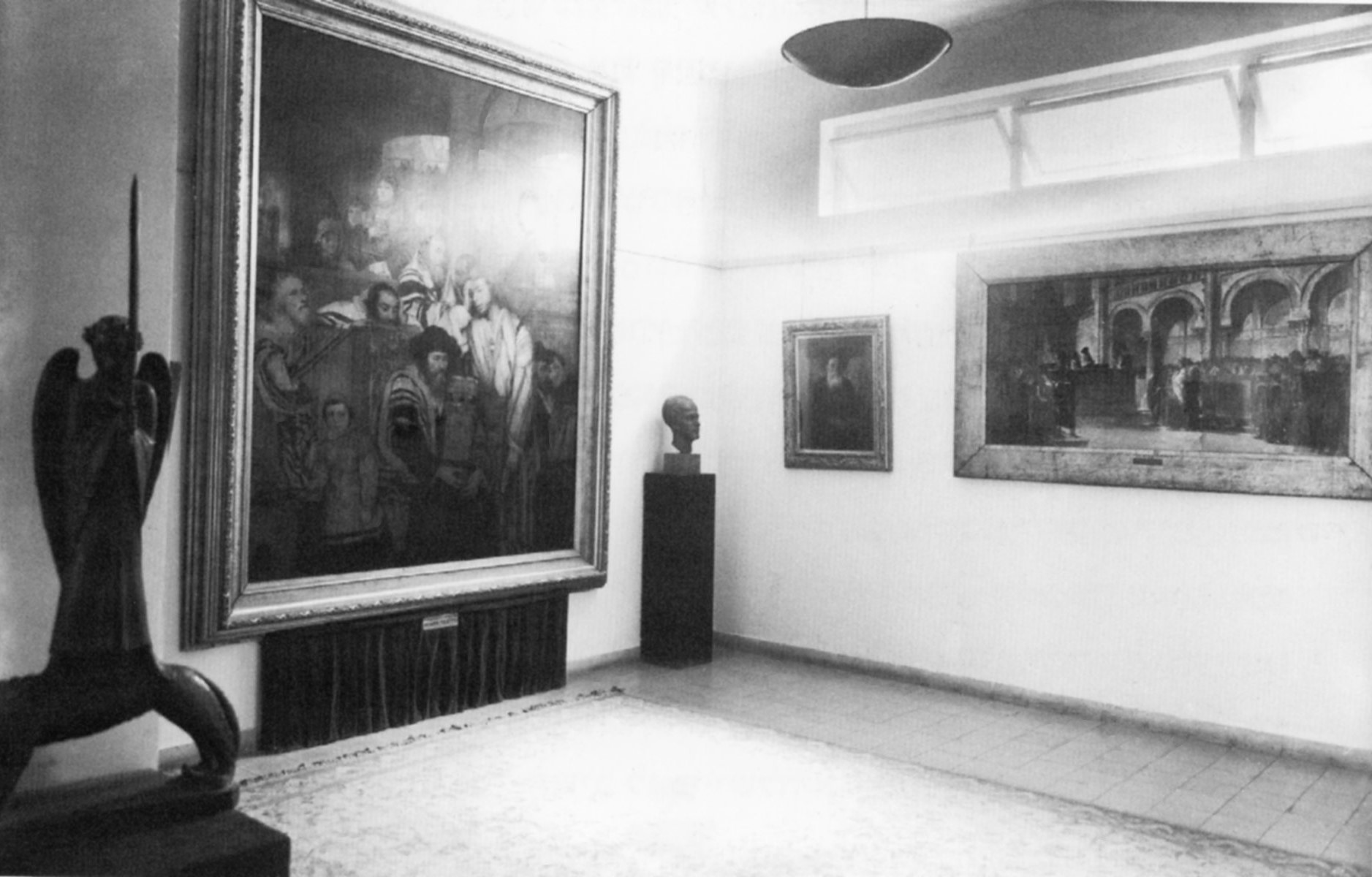
Avraham Soskin, Hall of Eastern European Art, 1939, Collection of the Eretz Israel Museum.

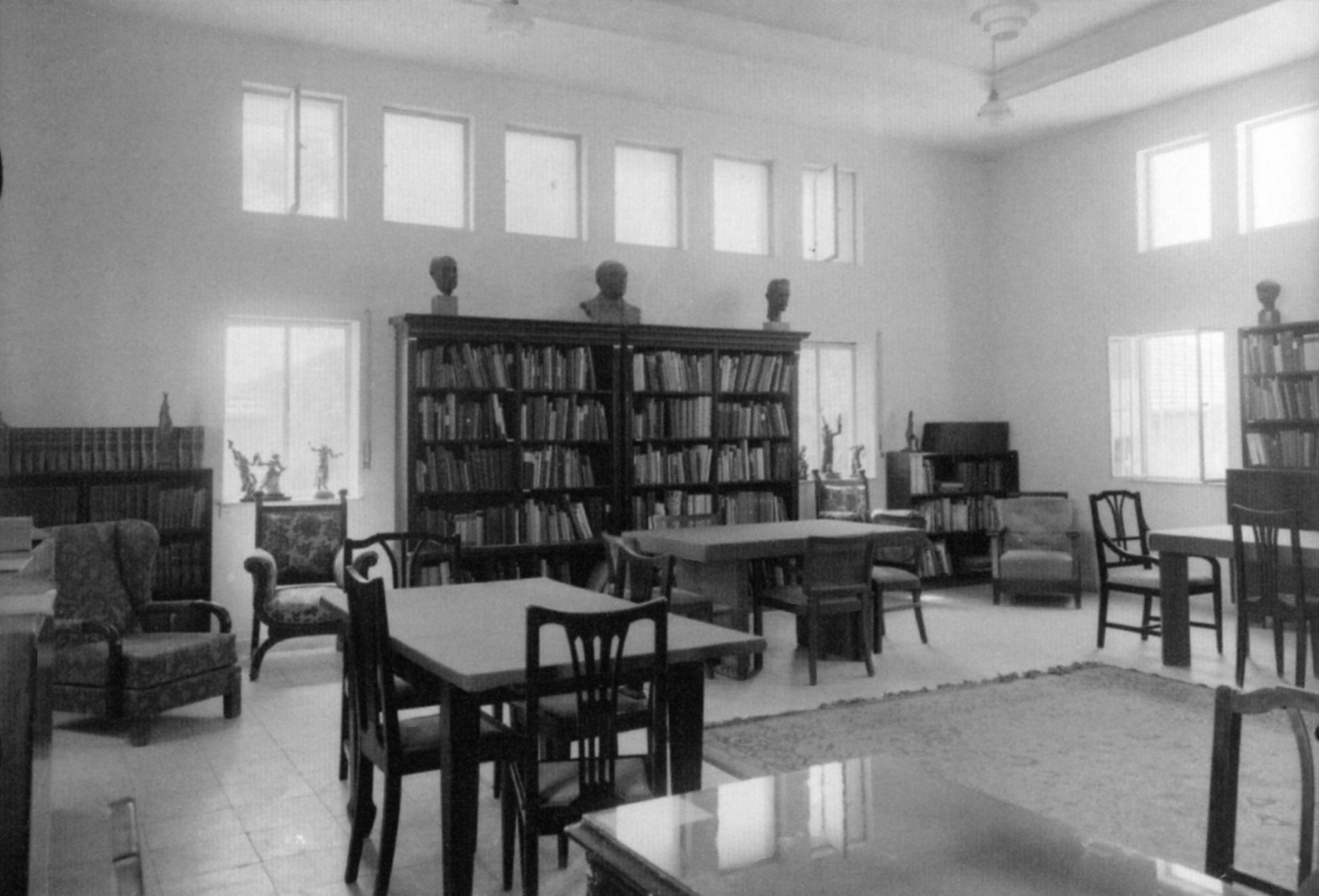
Avraham Soskin, Tel Aviv Museum Library, upper floor (after 1946–1947), Eretz Israel Museum collection.

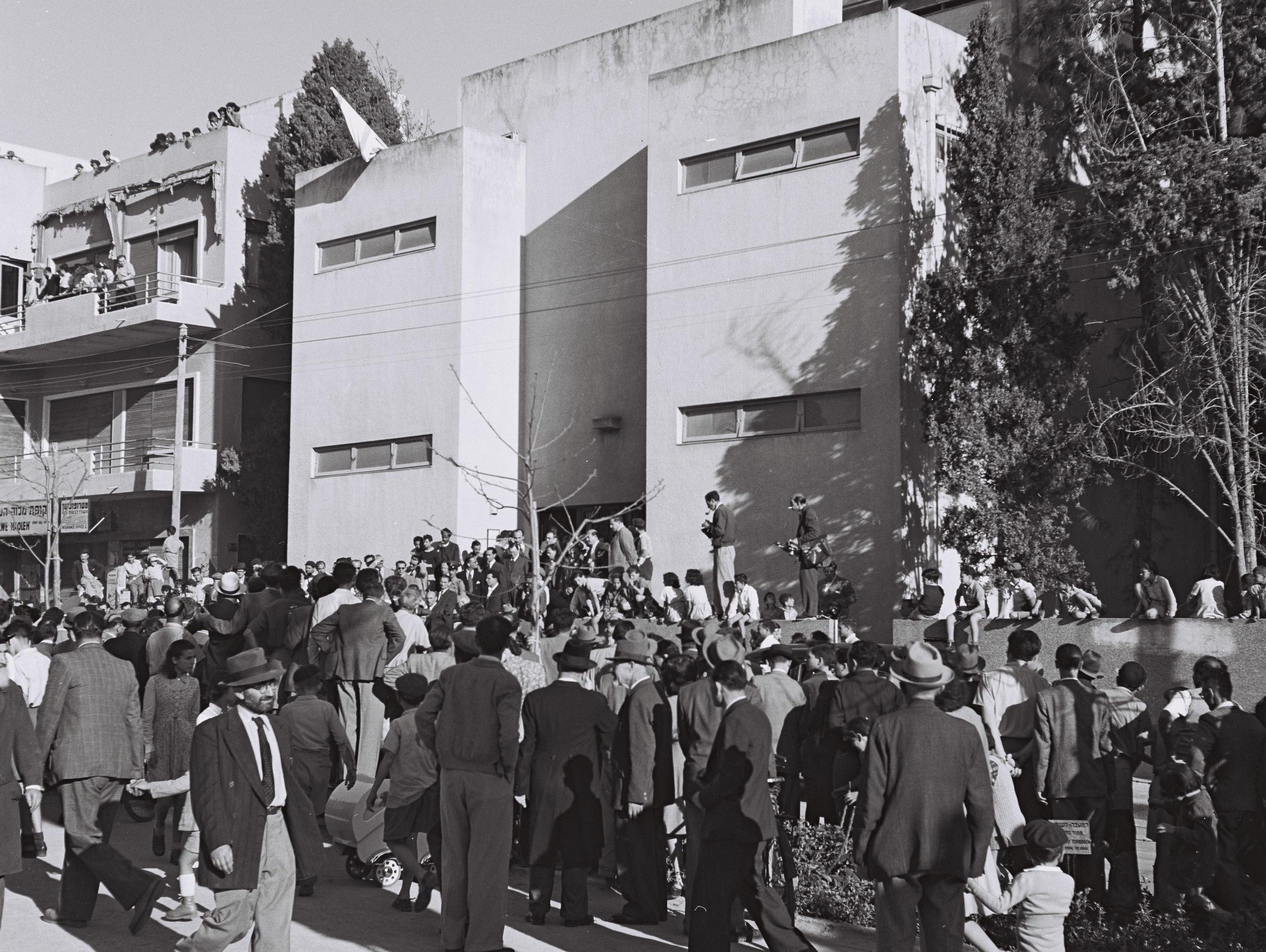
Locals gathered outside as Independence was declared inside the building on 14 May, 1948

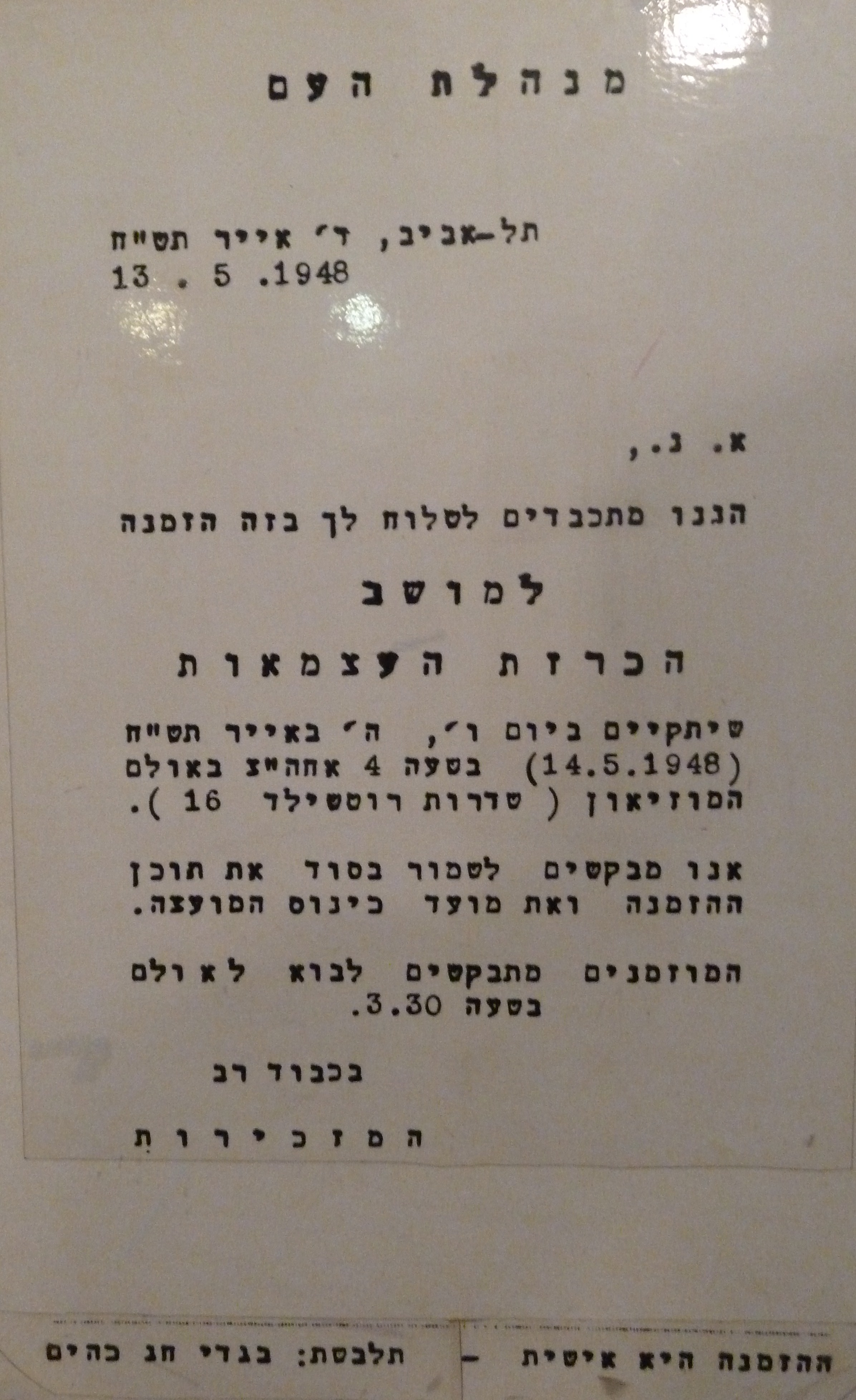
Invitation to the Independence Ceremony

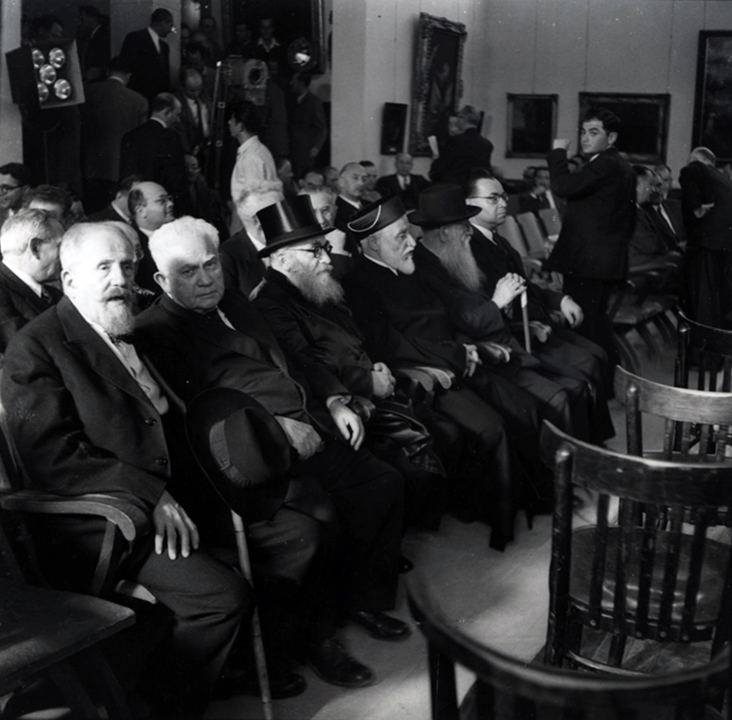
Rudi Weissenstein, the declaration of independence ceremony, 14 May 1948

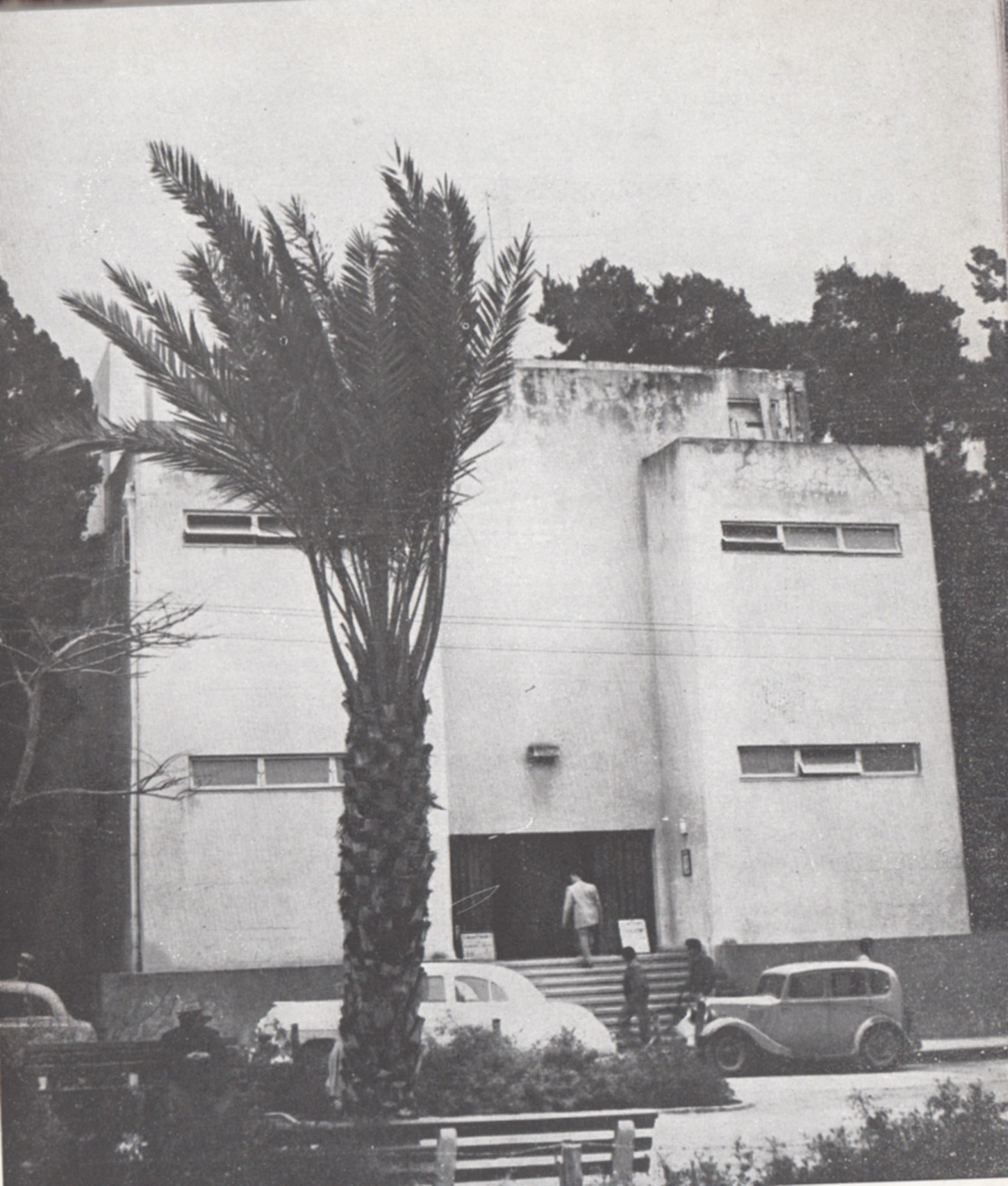
Tel Aviv Art Museum between 1948–1951

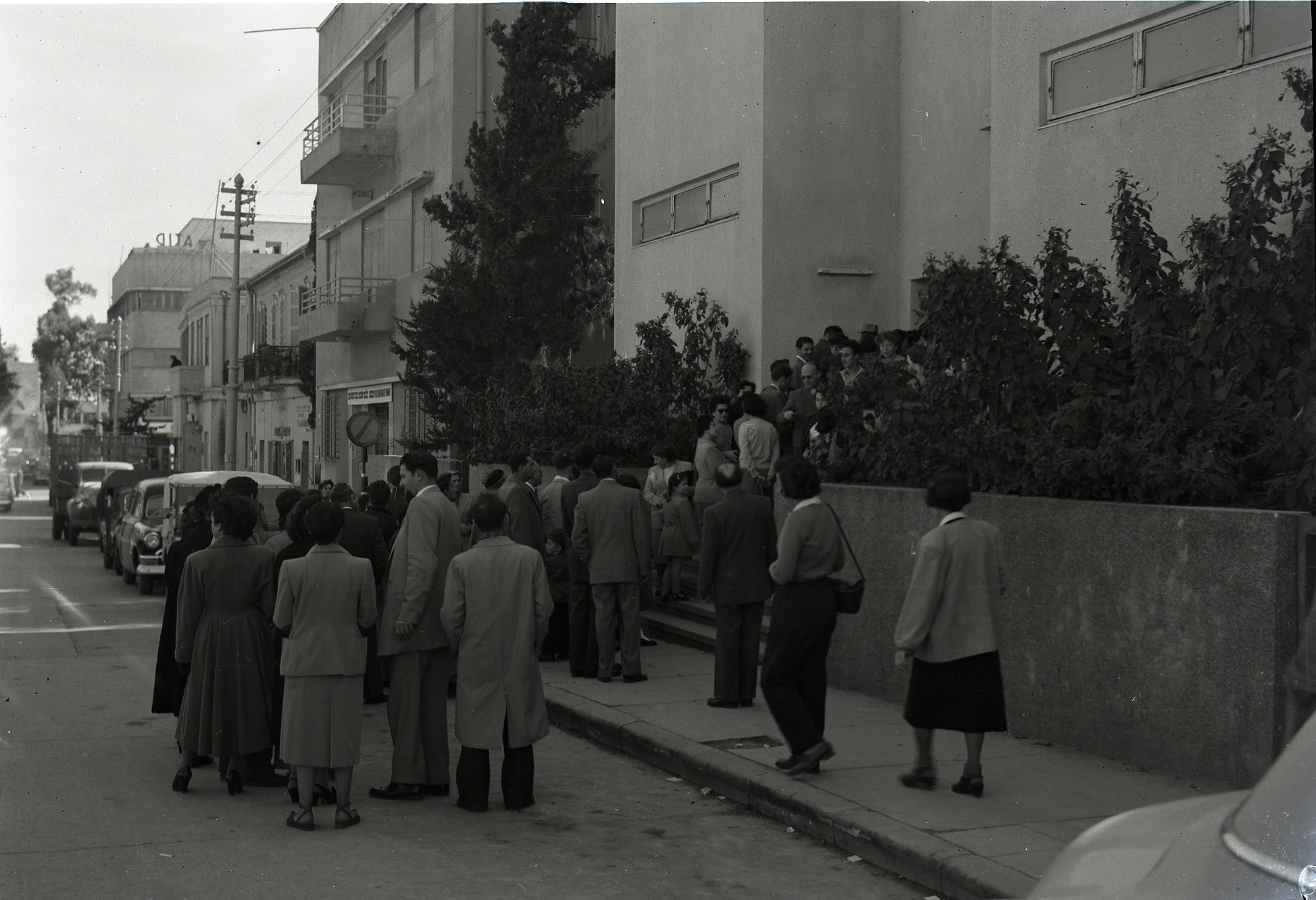
Beno Rothenberg, museum visitors in 1954

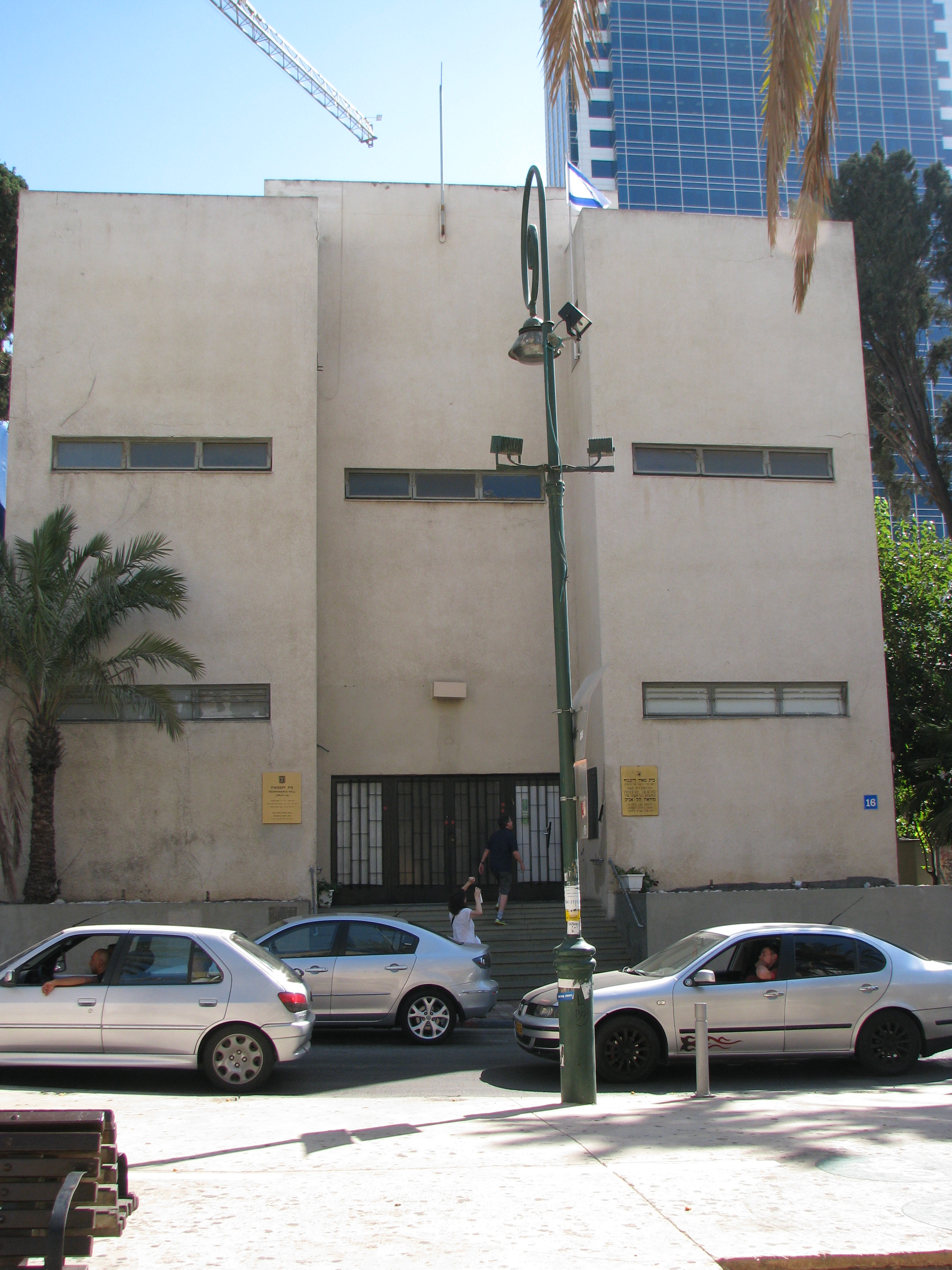
Independence Hall in 2013

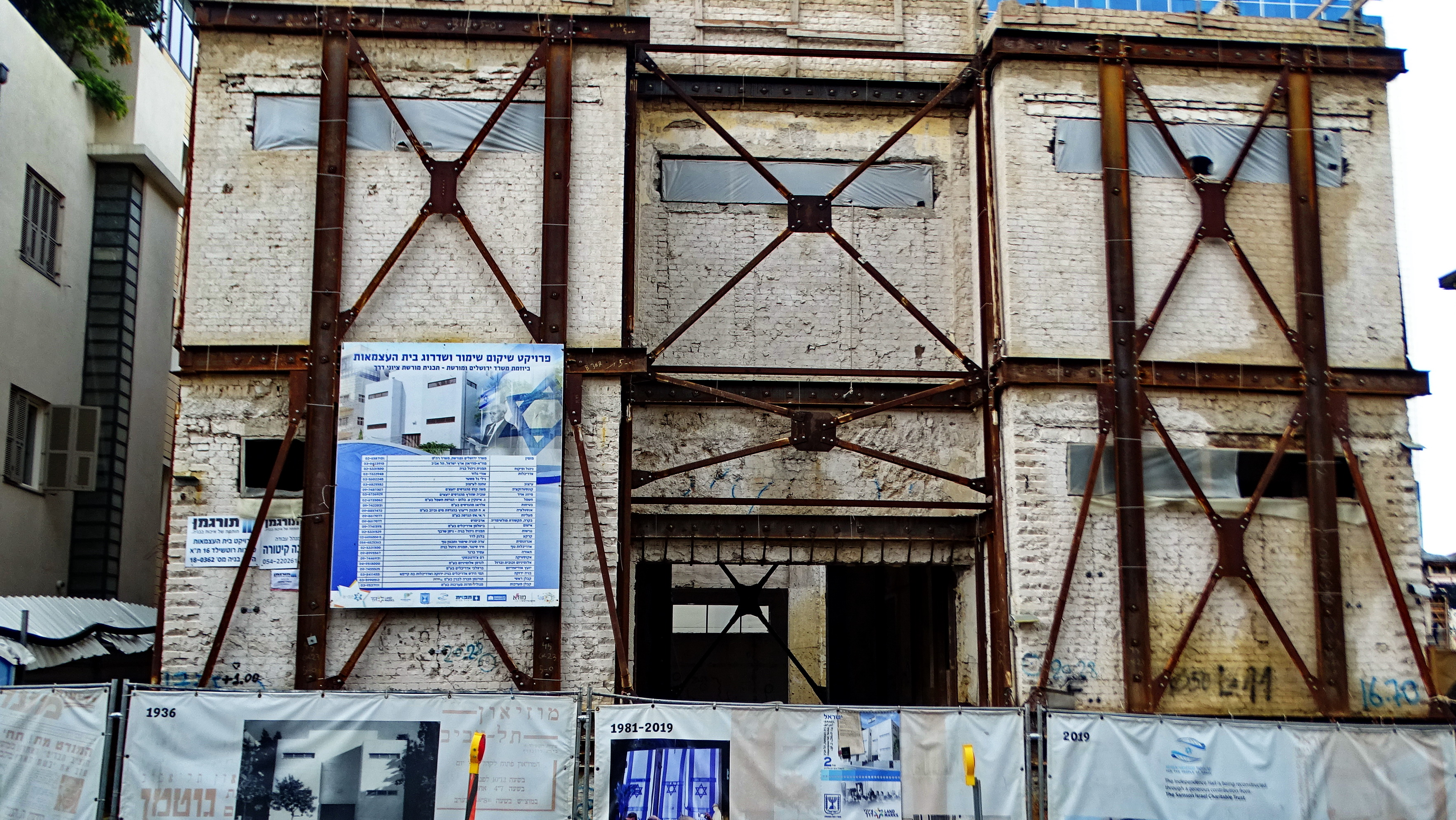
Renovations underway at Independence Hall in 2023
