= Walter Eytan =

Israeli diplomat (1910–2001)

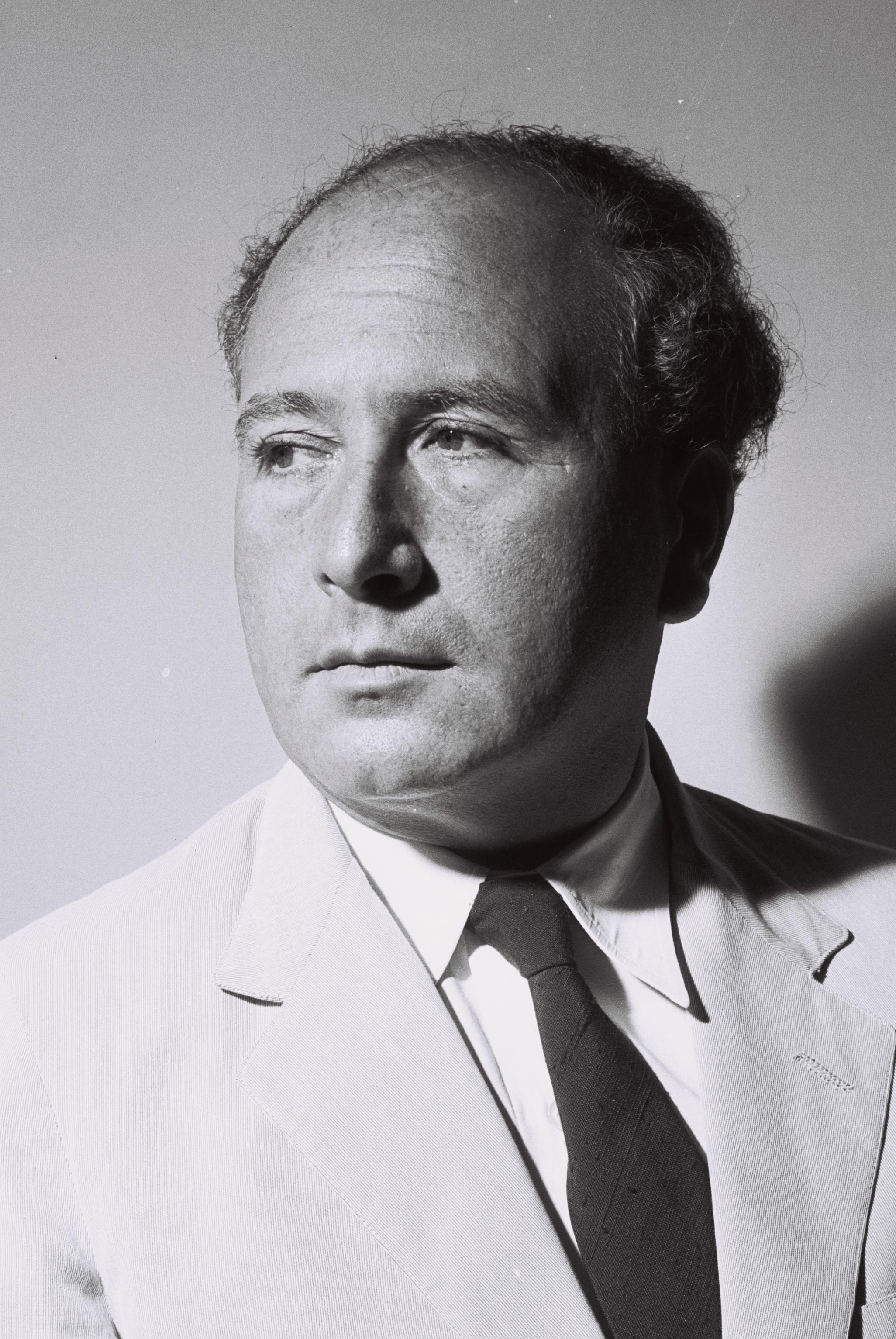
Walter Eytan

Walter Eytan (Hebrew: ולטר איתן; 24 July 1910 – 23 May 2001) was an Israeli diplomat. He served as Director General of the Israeli Foreign Ministry in 1948–1959 and Israeli ambassador to France in 1959–1970.

== Biography ==
Walter Ettinghausen (later Eytan) was born in Munich, Germany. During World War I, his family moved to Switzerland and then settled in England, where he attended St Paul's School, London. He became an Oxford University don. He was recruited to intelligence work from his post as a lecturer in Medieval German, undergoing basic military training as a tank gunner and assigned to the Naval Section at Bletchley Park, where he supervised the translation of German messages. Eytan and his brother, Ernest Ettinghausen, played important roles in the codebreaking effort, which Walter described in a contribution to a 1992 book on Bletchley. After World War II, Walter was one of a number of Jewish codebreakers at Bletchley who went on to play a key role in establishing the new State of Israel.

== Diplomatic career ==
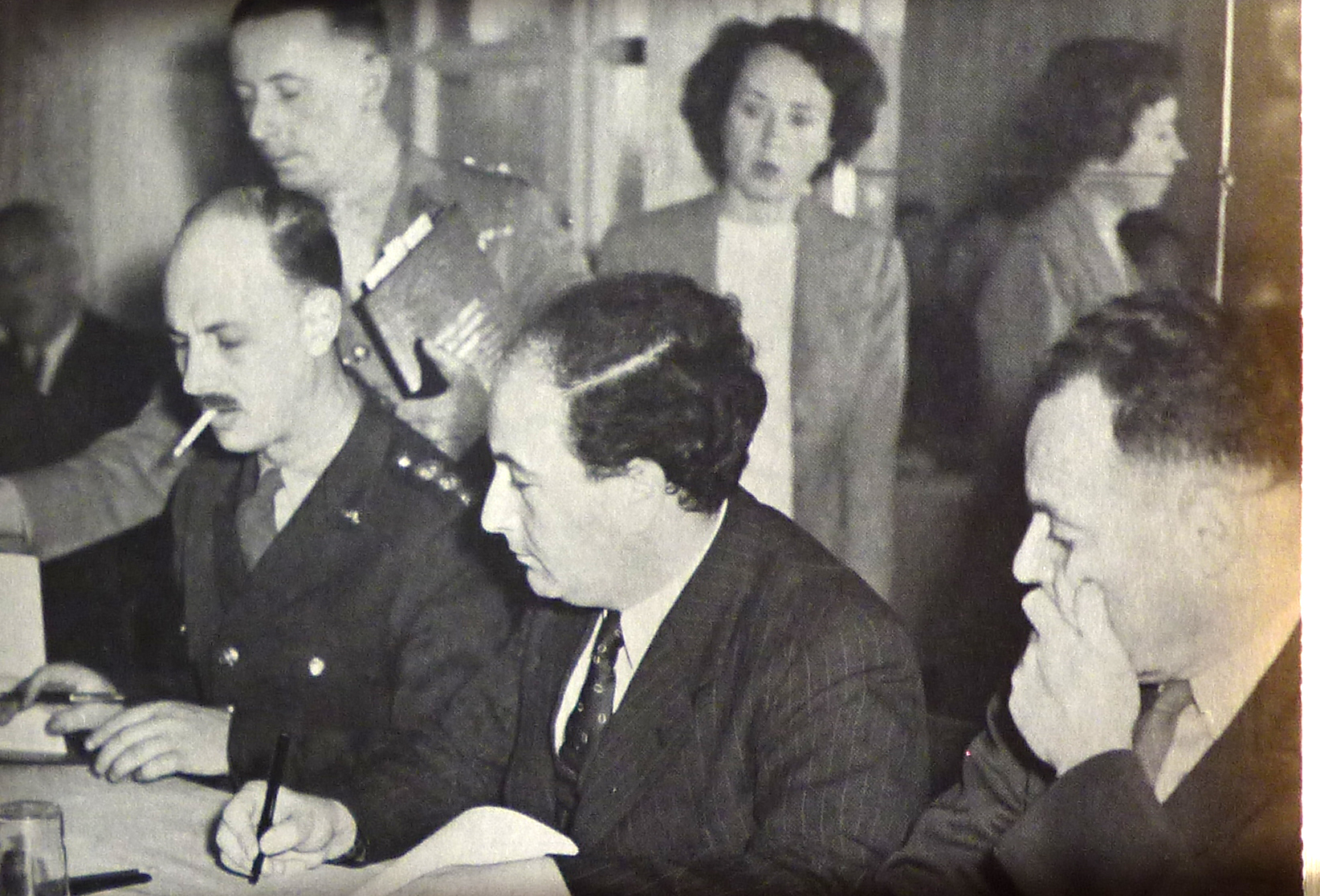
Walter Eytan (centre) signing the Israel-Egypt Armistice Agreement, 24 February 1949.

Eytan moved to Jerusalem in 1946, becoming a spokesman for the political department of the Jewish Agency for Israel. He was also the first principal of the Jewish Agency's Public Service College, established in 1946, which started with twenty-five students including five women.

On 9 January 1948 he presented the first draft of an "Outline Plan for the Foreign Office and Foreign Service of the Jewish State." It proposed seven geographic divisions: Middle East, Europe, Eastern Europe, North American, Latin America, British Empire and Asia and Africa. There would also be six functional divisions: United Nations, Consular, Economic, Legal Information and Training and Research.

On 12 June 1948 he was able to leave Jerusalem and join the fledgling Foreign Ministry in a villa at Sarona in Tel Aviv. He was immediately appointed Director General. By July the ministry had a staff of over 100, including many former members of the Jewish Agency Political Department. One of the first decisions taken was what adjective should be used: Israelite and Israelian were rejected in favour of Israeli.

Eytan was the head of delegation to 1949 Armistice negotiations at Rhodes. The delegation included Yigal Yadin, Reuven Shiloah and Eliahu Sasson. He considered the Jordanian delegation to be "unimpressive ... helpless and lost"; he describes the Syrian delegation as "fiercely argumentative."

On 16 March 1949 he was with Moshe Dayan and Yigael Yadin during an all night meeting with King Abdullah at his palace, El Shuneh, close to the Dead Sea. He had another meeting with the King in Amman in October 1950. The King held the meeting against the wishes of his Ministers.

The following month Eytan led the Israeli delegation to the United Nations peace conference in Lausanne. One of the major issues discussed was what was to happen to Palestinian refugees who had left their homes during the fighting. In a statement, 5 May 1949, Eytan said: "It would be doing the refugees a disservice to let them (the refugees) persist in the belief that if they returned, they would find their houses or shops or fields intact ... any Arab house that survived the impact of war ... now shelters a Jewish family. There can be no return to the status quo ante." His delegation's final compromise offer was that Israel would take control of the Gaza Strip with its residents including refugees and would accept the return of 100,000 refugees. At the time Eytan estimated that there were a total of 800,000 refugees. On the territorial issues the delegation was prepared to consider a compromise on Eilat, which Eytan was not convinced was of any strategic importance. By August 1949 it was understood by all the participants that the conference had failed.

During Isser Be'eri's trial for the wrongful execution of Meir Tobianski, he supported a member of the Foreign Ministry research department who leaked a secret document to the defence lawyers that implied Tobianski had passed information to the British.

In December 1949 he asked the Israeli Army to stop mass deportations of Palestinians since large groups resulted in complaints being raised with the Mixed Armistice Commission. In particular the Foreign Ministry blocked an IDF plan to create a 5–10 km Arab-free zone along the Lebanon border. He suggested that they "expel them in small groups or individually." Despite this, on 31 May 1950, 120 prisoners from an IDF detention camp near Rehovot were forced into the Jordanian desert, south of the Dead Sea. Due to the subsequent international criticism Eytan had to assure the US ambassador that those responsible would be punished.

In 1951 he was a member of a four-man committee, including Yigal Yadin, Reuven Shiloah and Moshe Sharett, set up to consider special operations outside the borders of Israel. Up till then these had come under the responsibility of the Foreign Ministry's Political department. On 1 September 1951 a new department was created reporting directly to the Prime Minister – the Central Institute for Intelligence and Special Missions, known as Mossad. The long-term decline of the Foreign Ministry's Research department and its inability to make its own intelligence assessments was one of the major findings of the 1974 Commission of inquiry into failings leading up to the 1973 war.

In February 1953 Eytan criticised the effectiveness of IDF retaliation raids.

By 1958 the Foreign Service consisted of 682 officials, 427 of whom were local to whichever state; there were 12 ambassadors, 15 ministers, 1 diplomatic representative, 3 charge d'affairs and 37 consuls-general and consuls. In addition the Foreign Ministry in Jerusalem had 338 staff. Its 1957–1958 budget was 10,650,000 Shekels, just over £2,000,000.

In September 1965 he arranged a secret meeting in Paris between Foreign Minister Golda Meir and King Hussein of Jordan. This was the king's first high level meeting with an Israeli.

On 24 May 1967, Eytan arranged at very short notice a meeting in Paris between Foreign Minister Abba Eban and President General Charles de Gaulle to explain Israel's views on the growing crisis with Egypt. De Gaulle opened the meeting with the advice: "Ne faites pas la guerre" ("Don't make war.") The meeting ended with him insisting that Israel should not fire the first shot in any conflict. On 4 June the French imposed an embargo on all arms deliveries to Israel.

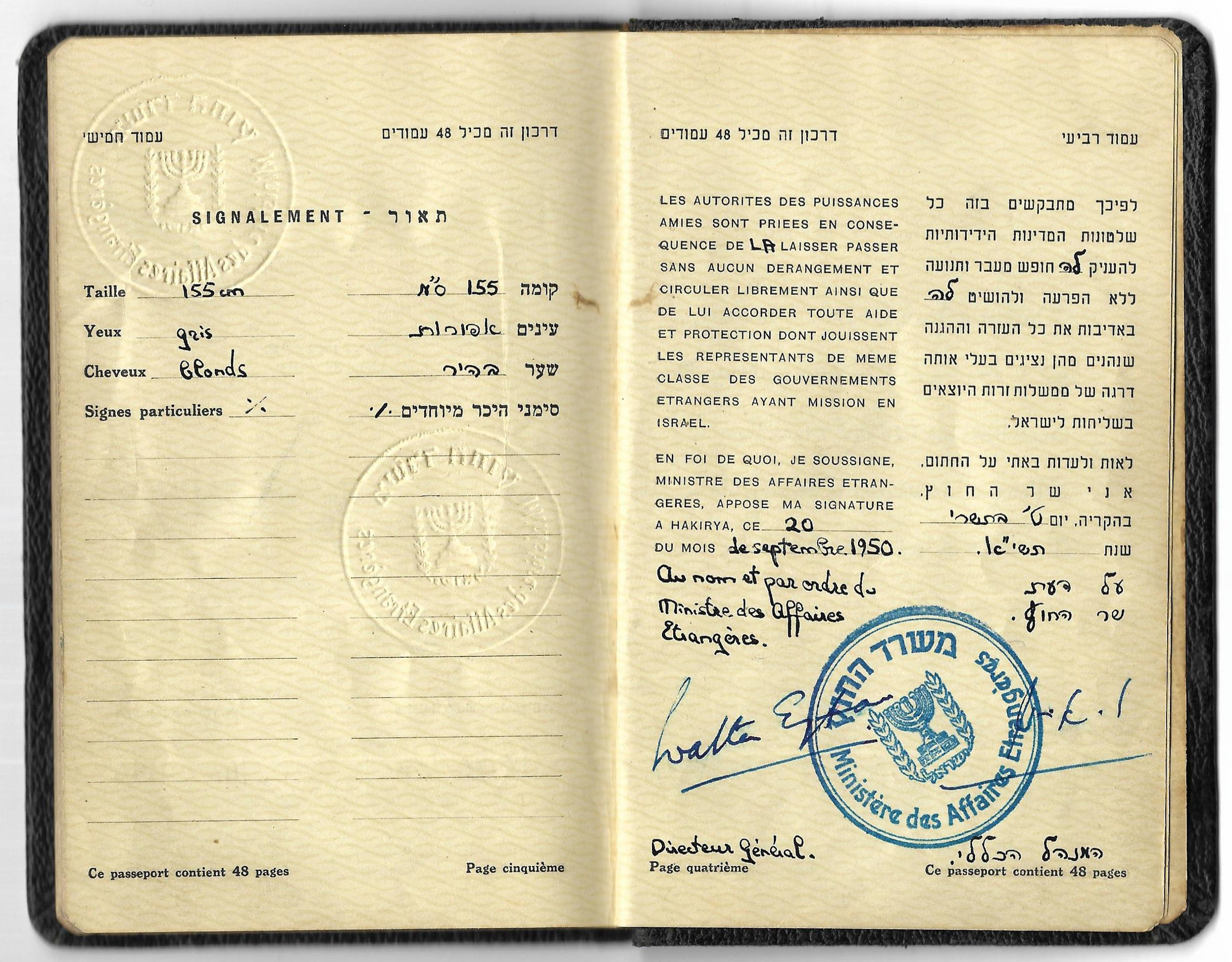
Israeli diplomatic passport extended by Walter Eytan in 1950 while acting Director General of the Foreign Ministry.
