= List of ambassadors of Israel to France =

This is a list of Israeli ambassadors to France.

Following the 1948 Arab–Israeli War, France recognised Israel in January 1949, and the first Israeli ambassador to France, Maurice Fischer, was appointed in 1949.

- Maurice Fischer (1949–1952)
- Jacob Tsur (1952–1959)
- Walter Eytan (1960–1970)
- Asher Ben-Natan (1970–1974)
- Mordechai Gazit (1974–1979)
- Meir Rosenne (1979–1983)
- Ovadia Soffer (1983–1992)
- Yehuda Lancry (1992–1995)
- Avi Pazner (1995–1998)
- Eliahu Ben-Elissar (1998–2000)
- Élie Barnavi (2001–2003)
- Nissim Zvili (2003–2005)
- Daniel Shek (2006–2010
- Yossi Gal (2010–2015)
- Aliza Bin-Noun (2015–2019)
- Yael German (2021–2022)
- Joshua Laurent Zarka (2024–)

== See also ==
- France–Israel relations
- List of French ambassadors to Israel
