= Moshe Kupferman =

Israeli artist

Moshe Kupferman משה קופפרמן
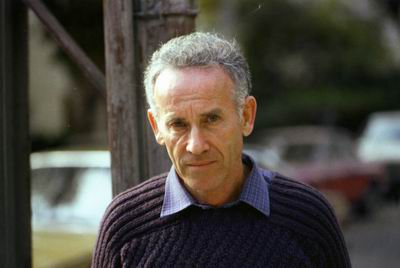
- Photograph of Moshe Kupferman
- Born: 1926; Poland
- Died: 2003 (aged 76–77); Israel
- Known for: Painting
- Movement: Israeli art

Moshe Kupferman (Hebrew: משה קופפרמן; 1926–2003) was an Israeli artist.

== Biography ==
Moshe Kupferman was born on 12 August 1926 in Jarosław, Poland. In 1941, he was exiled with his family to camps in the Urals and in Germany. Moshe Kupferman's work links recent lyric abstraction to the modernistic. It is the result of a process beginning with free, uncritical expression bordering on personal confession, and continuing with critical painting, in which the artist "erases" his "confession". The final result testifies to the preceding stages, and to the inherent conflicts in his work, between expressive drama and introspection, form and atmosphere, destruction and construction. The contradictions he succeeded in integrating in his work placed Kupferman in the front ranks of Israeli art.

Moshe Kupferman died on 20 June 2003 in Israel, in the Lohamei HaGeta'ot – kibbutz, which he had founded and where he lived and worked as an artist for many years.

== Education ==
- 1973 course by Joseph Zaritsky and Avigdor Stematsky

== Awards and prizes ==
- 1971: Schiff Prize – from the Haifa Municipality
- 1972: Sandberg Prize from Israel Museum, Jerusalem;
- 1991: Haim Gamzou Prize for the Advancement of the Arts, from Tel Aviv Museum of Art
- 1996: Sussman Prize for Paintings of the Shoah, Yad Vashem, Jerusalem;
- 1998: Eugen Kolb Prize for Israeli Graphic Arts, Tel Aviv Museum;
- 2000: Israel Prize for Painting, together with Michael Gross and Micha Bar Am.
