= Carl Rubin (architect) =

Israeli architect (1899–1955)

- קרל רובין
- Born: 24 June 1899; Sniatyn, Polish Galicia, Austria-Hungary (now Ukraine)
- Died: 7 February 1955 (aged 55)
- Resting place: Old Cemetery, Herzliya
- Education: University of Vienna
- Occupation: Architect
- Spouse: Margot Rubin
- Projects: See list: Citrus House (Beit Hadar); Rivka Greenwald House; Independence Hall

Carl Rubin (Hebrew: קרל רובין; 24 June 1899 – 7 February 1955) was an Israeli architect known for his work in the international style. He designed many buildings in this style in Tel Aviv.

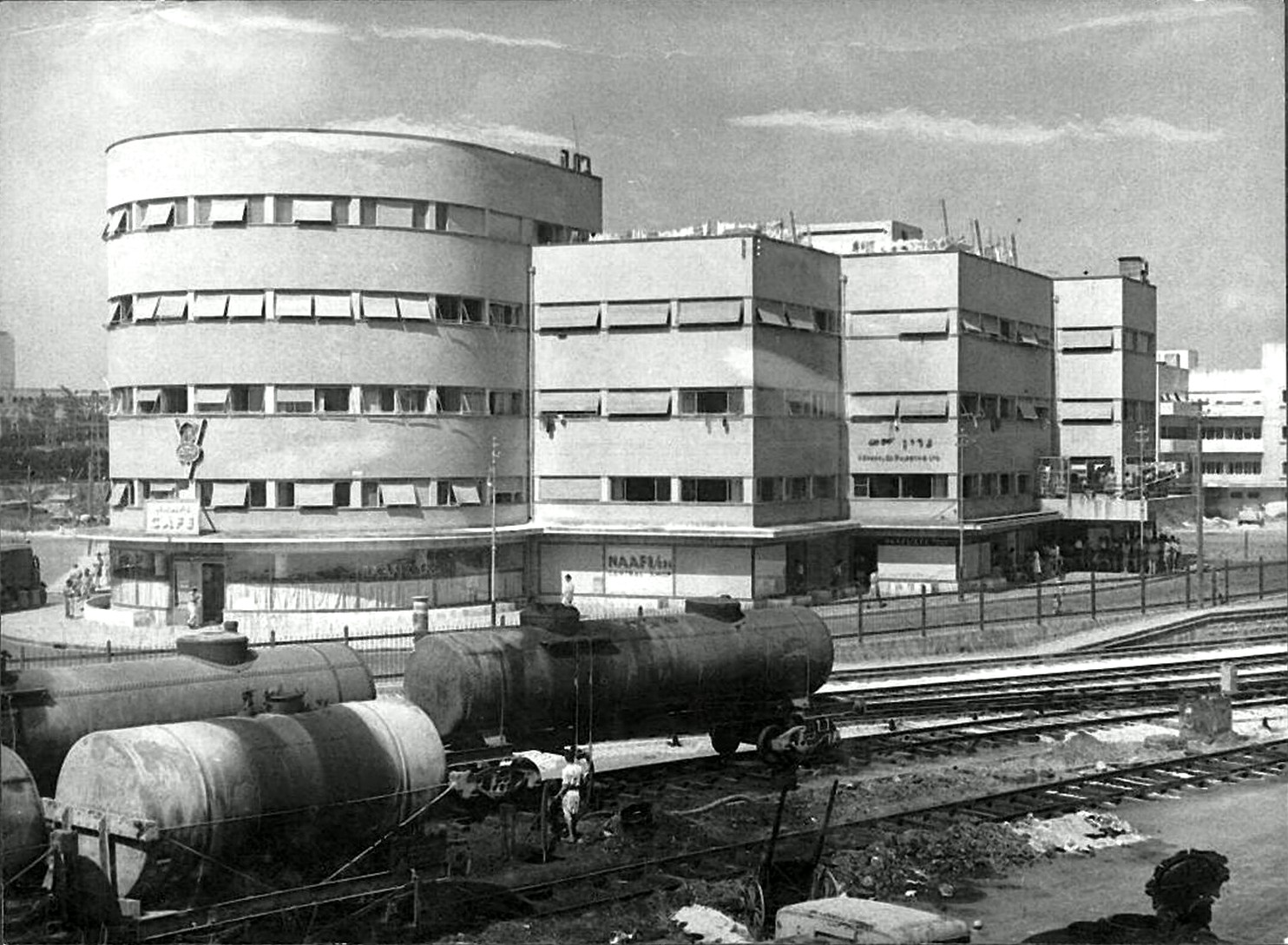
Citrus House/Beit Hadar, Tel Aviv (1946)

== Biography ==
Carl Rubin was born in 1899 in Sniatyn in Galicia. He studied architecture at the University of Vienna in Vienna. In 1920, Rubin immigrated to Eretz Israel, settling in Tel Aviv. In 1931, Rubin returned to Berlin to work for Erich Mendelsohn, an Allenstein-born Jewish architect whose architectural philosophy influenced Rubin's later designs.

In 1932, Rubin moved back to Tel Aviv in Mandate Palestine and opened his own architectural office. He contributed to the development of Tel Aviv and UNESCO's later recognition of the "White City" as a World Heritage Site.

== Projects ==
=== Dizengoff House/Independence Hall ===
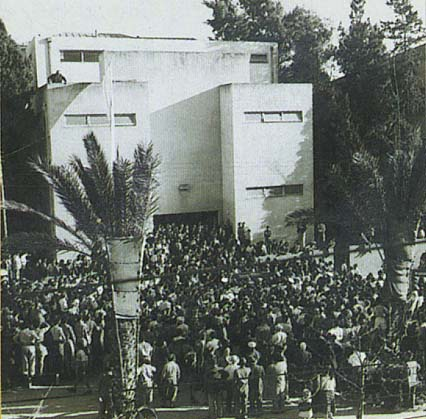
Celebratory crowd outside the Dizengoff House (now Independence Hall) for the Israeli Declaration of Independence, 14 May 1948

One of Rubin's important designs was his remodeling of the building that became Israel's Independence Hall (at Rothschild Boulevard 16). In 1932, Rubin resigned the home of Me'ir Dizengoff, Mayor of Tel Aviv who donated it to the city as the first home of the Tel Aviv Museum of Art.

=== Dr. Sadovsky House ===
Rubin designed numerous residential complexes in Tel Aviv. One of these buildings, the home of Dr. Sadovsky (85, Rothschild Boulevard), designed in 1933, sold for 7 million dollars in 2007.

=== Citrus House/Beit Hadar ===
In 1935–1936, Rubin designed the Beit Hadar office building aka Citrus House, the first in Tel Aviv with a steel frame structure.
