= MABMAT =

Robotic imaging system

MABMAT is a robotic imaging system designed to capture photographs and videos of crime scenes and map locations in 360 degrees. The robot's main feature is taking 360-degree photos and videos and converting them to virtual crime scene data which can be used with virtual reality headsets to examine the recorded scene.

The MABMAT was not invented by robotics engineers; however, it was created by a forensic science expert and criminal justice professional. The designer claims that the robot can be the most effective system to record a crime investigation because it can capture a location in 360 degrees in high-definition video and high-resolution stills. The MABMAT has been touted to assist human investigators and members of the jury to reach proper decisions in and out of the courtroom. With the help of the MABMAT, jurors would be able to accurately observe crime scenes, and investigators can study footage without traveling to the scene.

Information about the MABMAT was revealed in August 2016. As of August 2019, the rover's second version with more advanced features such as AI room detection, and object recognition, is in development.

== History ==
The MABMAT was developed by Mehzeb Chowdhury, a then-PhD researcher in forensic science and criminal investigations from Durham University.

Before development of the MABMAT, Chowdhury, a Barrister-at-Law by trade, had been observing how judges study crime scenes and how new technology was being implemented into crime investigations.

Chowdhury published an article on "The Conversation" noting how jurors are seldom allowed to visit crime scenes and the incredible difficulties that befall everyone (judges, lawyers, law enforcement and the jurors themselves) involved when they do. Chowdhury explained that by the time a juror visits and studies a crime scene, degradation would result in a marked difference in every aspect. Photography and sketching are crucial parts of gathering and using evidence but, they do not provide accurate representations of crime scenes due to the subjective nature of these methods.

Chowdhury believes that investigators can begin to rely on new technology that is specifically designed for crime scene investigation, especially those capable of 3D imaging and virtual reality. Chowdhury discussed how researchers at Staffordshire University, led by Caroline Sturdy Colls used virtual reality headsets and video game software to produce virtual crime scenes. He explained how virtual crime scenes can be used as a supplement to photographs and videos of crime scenes, allowing for jurors to decide on their own which articles of evidence should be prioritized and given weight. He has noticed the very high prices of the virtual reality headsets such as the HTC Vive, Oculus Rift, and the PlayStation VR. He believes that much cheaper and more competent pieces of technology are capable of transforming pictures and videos to 3D-rendered crime scene animations. The flaws of crime investigation and the improvements of technology led to the creation of the MABMAT.

According to Chowdhury, approximately fifty police departments in the United States and the United Kingdom have provided crime scene investigation data to support the MABMAT project. The system is expected to be tested in police departments.

== Specifications ==
Since the development of the MABMAT is self-funded, Chowdhury and his team only spent 299 pounds (or 374 U.S. dollars) on all parts that were required to build the rover.

Chowdhury described all the parts that were used to create the MABMAT:

- off-the-shelf parts such as metal pieces and circuits
- a 360-degree camera that captures photographs and videos, which can be played on any computer. This camera can automatically capture pictures and record videos by itself.
- a Google Cardboard—a virtual reality headset that provides a virtual reality experience similar to that of the HTC Vive, Oculus Rift, and the PlayStation VR. However, unlike those three headsets, the Google Cardboard does not render three-dimensional graphics and does not have a power central processing unit. This device only costs about ten dollars, while headsets like the Oculus Rift cost at least seven hundred dollars. This—along with the metal pieces and circuits—may have been the reason for the MABMAT's low budget.
- ultrasonic, motion, and infrared sensors which help the MABMAT navigate crime scene.
- Arduino—a microcontroller board that have built-in open-source software which allow user to program and create interactive objects such as the MABMAT
- Raspberry Pi—another microcontroller board with its own open-source software

The MABMAT is to be controlled with a tablet, smartphone, or a Bluetooth remote.

The team of researchers stated that the design of the MABMAT is inspired by NASA's "Curiosity"—a rover that is investigating Mars.

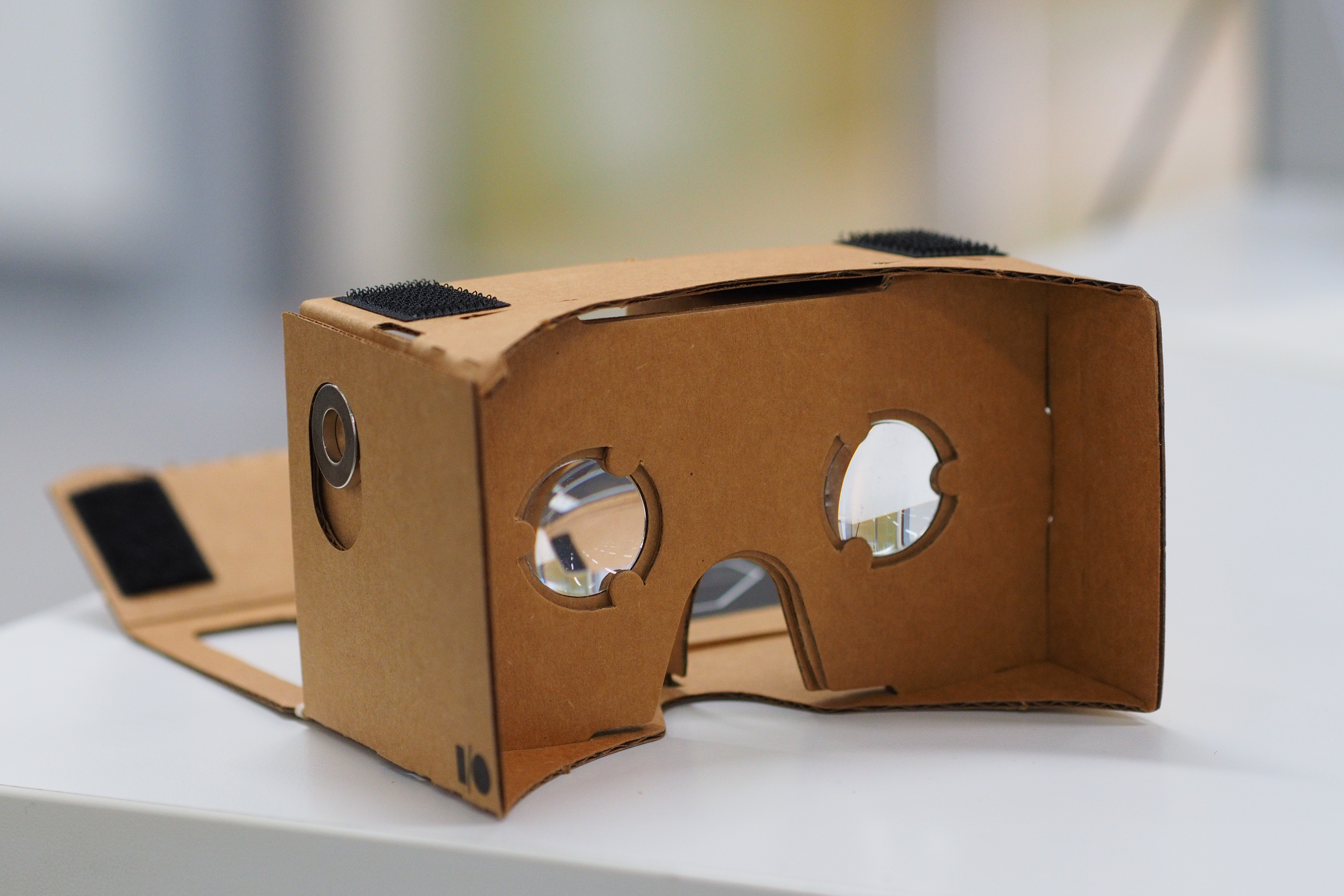
A Google Cardboard--a VR headset that is implemented in the MABMAT rover
