= Caroline Sturdy Colls =

British forensic archaeologist

- Born: 1985 (age 40–41)
- Education: University of Birmingham
- Known for: Forensic investigation of Treblinka extermination camp

Caroline Sturdy Colls (born 1985) is a British archaeologist and academic, specializing in Holocaust studies, identification of human remains, forensic archaeology and crime scene investigation. She is Professor of Holocaust Archaeology and Genocide Investigation at University of Huddersfield, and serves as director for the Centre of Archaeology there. Previously she was a Professor and Director of the Centre of Archaeology at the University of Staffordshire. Prof Sturdy Colls also undertakes consultancy for the UK Police forces. Her main area of interest is the methodology of investigation into the Holocaust and genocide murder sites with special consideration given to religious norms associated with the prohibition of excavating a grave.

Sturdy Colls graduated from the University of Birmingham in 2007 with a BA(Hons) in Archaeology and Ancient History, and with the MPhil in Archaeological Practice in 2008. In 2012 she completed her PhD thesis in Archaeology and Antiquity at the University of Birmingham, titled "Holocaust Archaeology: Archaeological Approaches to Landscapes of Nazi Genocide and Persecution". She is the author of numerous scientific publications, lectures and selected books on the subject, not to mention TV interviews and documentaries.

== Archaeological studies ==
Sturdy Colls led a team of archeologists in the most recent excavations on the grounds of the Treblinka extermination camp Museum, resulting in the discovery of several floor tiles believed to have been used in the lining of the gas chambers. The tiles were made by Dziewulski & Lange ceramic factory in Opoczno. Her discovery became a subject of the Smithsonian film made for television. Approval for a limited archaeological study was issued for the first time in 2010 to a British team from Staffordshire using non-invasive technology and Lidar remote sensing notably, because neither the authorities nor the Jewish religious leaders in Poland allowed excavations at the camp out of respect for the dead. Sturdy Colls analyzed soil resistance at the site with ground-penetrating radar. Features that appeared to be structural were found, two of which were thought to be the remains of the gas chambers, and therefore the study was allowed to continue.

The archaeological team discovered three new mass graves. At the site of the previously unknown foundations several yellow tiles were unearthed, pressed with a symbol D✡L resembling a “Star of David”. The logo was soon identified as the pierced mullet star belonging to the Polish ceramics factory from Opoczno founded by Jan Dziewulski and brothers Józef and Władysław Lange. It was therefore not the Star of David as reported by the Israeli Ynet News service which made the announcement. The tiles located by the ground-penetrating radar were claimed to provide the first physical evidence of the existence of the gas chambers in Camp Two. For her work, Sturdy Colls was awarded the 2025 Dan David Prize and a medal of honor by Treblinka extermination camp Museum.

== Selected publications ==
Books

- Sturdy Colls, C. (contrib.) Forensic Architecture (2014), Forensis: The Architecture of Public Truth. Berlin: Sternberg Press. ISBN 978-3-95679-011-9.
- Sturdy Colls, C., with Hunter, J. and Simpson B. (2013), Forensic Approaches to Buried Remains. Wiley, London. ISBN 978-0-470-66629-6.
- Sturdy Colls, C. (in print) Holocaust Archaeologies: Approaches and Future Directions. New York: Springer.
- Sturdy Colls, C. (in print) Finding Treblinka. Archaeological Investigations at Treblinka Extermination and Labour Camps, 2014 in English and Polish.
- Morewitz, S. and Sturdy Colls, C. (2016). Handbook of Missing Persons. New York: Springer.

Book Chapters

- Sturdy Colls, C. (2016). ‘Earth conceal not my blood’: forensic and archaeological approaches to locating the remains of Holocaust victims’ In: Dreyfus, J-M. and Anstett, E. Human remains in society: Curation and exhibition in the aftermath of genocide and mass-violence. Manchester: Manchester University Press.
- Sturdy Colls, C. (2015). "Badania archeologiczne w obozie zagłady i karnym obozie pracy w Treblince." In: Edward Kopówka (ed.), Treblinka: historia i pamięć. Siedlce: Muzeum Regionalne w Siedlcach. ISBN 978-83-88761-51-5.
- Sturdy Colls, C. and Colls, K. (2014), "Reconstructing a painful past: A non-invasive approach to reconstructing Lager Norderney in Alderney, the Channel Islands." In: Ch’ng, E. (ed.), Visual Heritage in the Digital Age. New York: Springer.
- Sturdy Colls, C. with Hunter, J. (2013), "Archeology." In Siegel, J. and Saukko, P. (eds.) Encyclopaedia of Forensic Sciences. 2nd edition. Vol. 1, pp. 18–32. Waltham: Academic Press.
- Sturdy Colls, C. (2013), "Ocena archeologiczna terenu byłego Obozu Zagłady w Treblince / Archaeological Survey of the Former Extermination Camp at Treblinka." In: Edward Kopówka (ed.), Co wiemy o Treblince? Stan Badań. Warsaw , Siedlce. ISBN 8388761382. (in Polish and English).

Papers

- Carr, G. and Sturdy Colls, C. (2016). "Taboo and sensitive heritage: labour camps, burials and the role of activism in the Channel Islands." International Journal of Heritage Studies 22(9), DOI: 10.1080/13527258.2016.1191524.
- Sturdy Colls, (2015). "Uncovering a Painful Past: Archaeology and the Holocaust." Conservation and Management of Archaeological Sites 17 (1) 38-55
- Sturdy Colls, C. (2014), "Gone but not forgotten: Archaeological approaches to the landscape of the former extermination camp at Treblinka, Poland," Holocaust Studies and Materials.
- Sturdy Colls, C. and Colls, K. (2013), "The Alderney Archaeological Research Project 2010-2012." Alderney Society Bulletin.
- Sturdy Colls, C. (2013), "The Archaeology of the Holocaust." British Archaeology Nr 130, p. 50-53.
- Sturdy Colls, C. (2012), "Holocaust Archaeology: Archaeological Approaches to Landscapes of Nazi Genocide and Persecution." Journal of Conflict Archaeology Nr 7(2), 71-105.
- Sturdy Colls, C. (2012), "O tym, co minęło, lecz nie zostało zapomniane: Badania archeologiczne na terenie byłego obozu zagłady w Treblince." Zagłada Żydów. Studia i Materiały. Nr 8, 77-112. (in Polish)
