= Werner von Fritsch =

German general (1880–1939)

Werner Freiherr von Fritsch
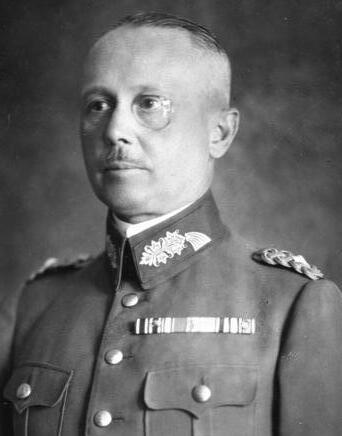
- Fritsch in 1932

Chief of the German Army High Command
- In office 1 June 1935 – 4 February 1938
- Führer: Adolf Hitler
- Preceded by: Office established
- Succeeded by: Walther von Brauchitsch

5th Chief of the German Army Command
- In office 1 February 1934 – 1 June 1935
- President: Paul von Hindenburg; Adolf Hitler
- Chancellor: Adolf Hitler
- Preceded by: Kurt von Hammerstein-Equord
- Succeeded by: Himself as Commander-in-Chief of the German Army

Personal details
- Born: Thomas Ludwig Werner von Fritsch; 4 August 1880 Benrath, Landkreis Düsseldorf, Rhine Province, Kingdom of Prussia, German Empire
- Died: 22 September 1939 (aged 59) Warsaw, Poland
- Resting place: Invalidenfriedhof, Berlin

Military service
- Allegiance: German Empire; Weimar Republic; Nazi Germany
- Branch/service: German Army
- Years of service: 1898–1939
- Rank: Generaloberst
- Commands: 1st Cavalry Division; 3rd Infantry Division; Supreme Commander of the Army
- Battles/wars: World War I; World War II; Siege of Warsaw †
- Awards: Order of the Red Eagle; Iron Cross; Golden Party Badge

Thomas Ludwig Werner Freiherr von Fritsch (4 August 1880 – 22 September 1939) was a German Generaloberst ('full general') who served as commander-in-chief of the German army from February 1934 until February 1938, when he was forced to resign after he was falsely accused of being homosexual.

The ousting of Fritsch and War Minister Blomberg, in the Blomberg-Fritsch affair, was a major step in Adolf Hitler's establishment of tighter control over the armed forces. Just over a year later, before the outbreak of World War II, Fritsch was recalled as colonel-in-chief of the 12th Artillery Regiment. He died in battle in Poland early in the war, the second German general to perish in that conflict after Wilhelm Fritz von Roettig.

== Early life ==
Fritsch was born in Benrath in the Rhine Province of the German Empire. He entered the Prussian Army at the age of 18; in 1901, he transferred to the Prussian military academy. In 1911, he was appointed to the German general staff, where he served during World War I.

== Interwar period ==
=== Weimar rule ===
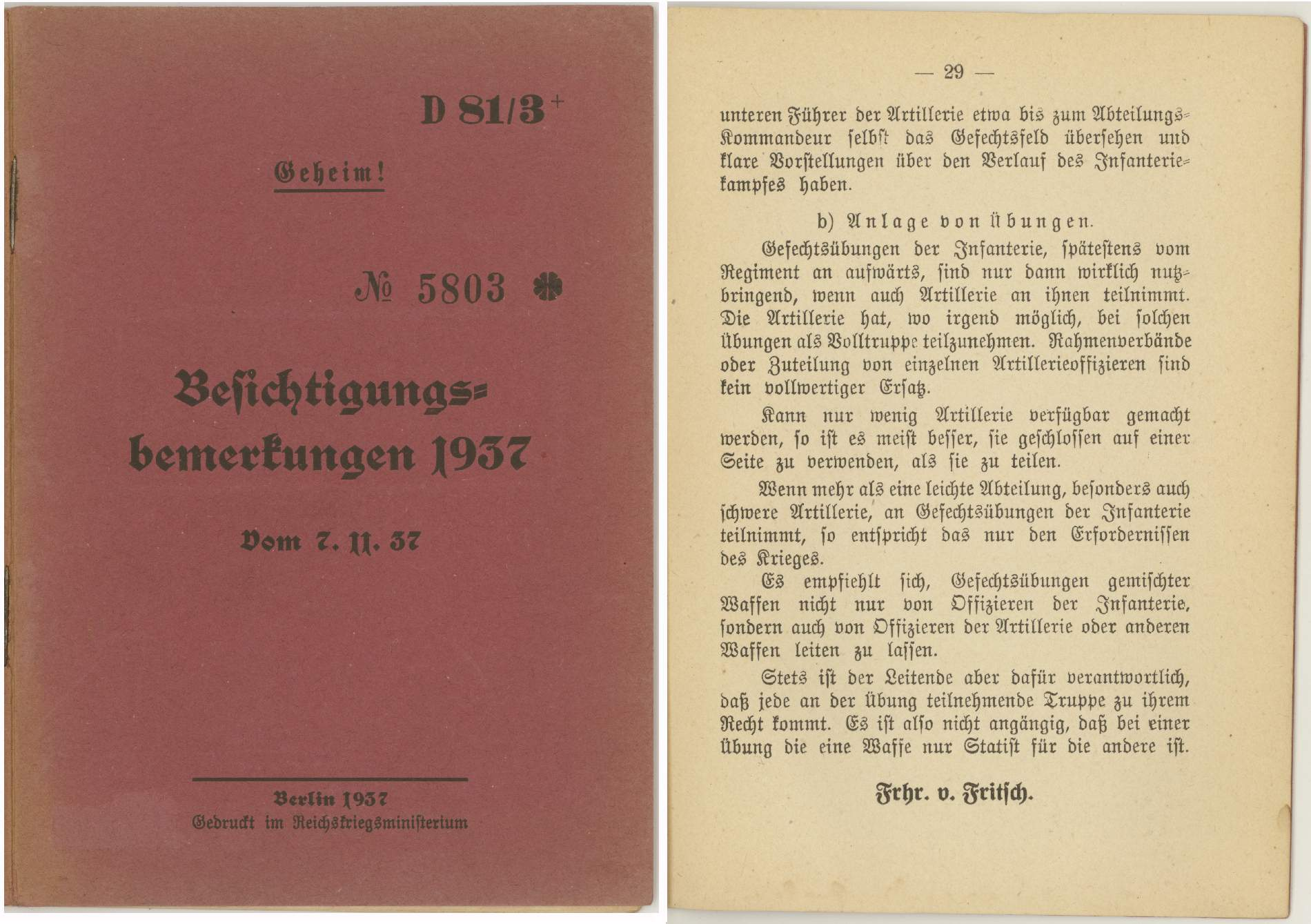
Manual written by Fritsch

During the interwar period, Fritsch served in the Weimar Republic's armed forces (Reichswehr). In 1924, Fritsch wrote a letter to Joachim von Stülpnagel where he expressed his hatred of democracy and his hope that General Hans von Seeckt would carry out a Putsch to establish a military dictatorship. Fritsch declared he was totally opposed to seeing another "black, red and gold cur" as chancellor (a reference to the colours of the Weimar Republic's flag) and wrote that he believed that Germany was being ruined by "the propaganda of the Jewish papers". Fritsch ended his letter with a list of all whom he hated:

For in the last resort Ebert, pacifists, Jews, democrats, black, red, and gold, and the French, and these women, and the whores, and the like, all cunts with the only exception of mother, these females, I tell you, are all the same thing, namely the people who want to destroy Germany. There may be small differences, but in the end it all amounts to the same. We can trust only ourselves. Trustworthyness, Truth & love only there is among us, German Men. Prösterchen, prostata!

The German historian Wolfram Wette wrote that Fritsch had come close to high treason with his letter, as he had taken the Reichswehreid oath to defend democracy, and in calling for a Putsch to destroy the democracy that Fritsch had pledged to defend was an act of "extreme disloyalty to the republic to which he had sworn an oath".

Fritsch was heavily involved in the secret German rearmament of the 1920s in which Germany sought to evade the terms of part 5 of the Treaty of Versailles, which had essentially disarmed it by limiting its army to 100,000 soldiers and forbidding it to have aircraft or tanks. As such, Fritsch, who worked closely with the Soviet Union with the secret rearmament, favoured a pro-Soviet foreign policy and had an extreme hatred for Poland. In 1928, Fritsch began work on the plan that became Fall Weiss, the invasion of Poland in 1939. He was promoted to major-general (Generalmajor) in 1932 by Kurt von Schleicher, who regarded him as a promising young officer.

=== Nazi rule ===
After the Nazis came to power in 1933, Fritsch was a strong supporter of the new regime, which he saw as a radical force that, if influenced by people like himself, would be a force for good. Wette wrote that as Fritsch was a member of "group of hardened anti-Semitics" in the officer corps, the anti-Semitism of Adolf Hitler was one of Fritsch's most important reasons for supporting the Nazi regime.

Fritsch was promoted to General der Artillerie and chief of the army command (Chef der Heeresleitung) on 1 February 1934, replacing General Kurt von Hammerstein-Equord. This was partly because Hitler saw him as a supporter of his regime and partly because Defence Minister Werner von Blomberg valued Fritsch for his professionalism. In February 1934, when Blomberg ordered that all soldiers who might be considered Jewish (by having at least a Jewish parent or grandparent who converted; long before the Nazis, the Reichswehr did not accept Jews) be given dishonourable discharges, Fritsch made no objection and carried out the order. On 31 December 1934, Fritsch went further and announced that it "goes without saying that an officer [should seek] a wife only within Aryan circles" and that any officer who married a Jewish woman would be dishonourably discharged at once.

According to William Shirer in The Rise and Fall of the Third Reich, Fritsch played a pivotal role when he balked at Hitler's initial proposal to the army that he succeed ailing President von Hindenburg upon his death. Fritsch ultimately betrayed the officer corps to the Führer by agreeing to that demand after consulting with his generals.

In late 1934 or early 1935, Fritsch and Blomberg successfully pressured Hitler into rehabilitating the name of General Kurt von Schleicher (who had been assassinated by the Nazis during the Night of the Long Knives) by claiming that as officers they could not stand the press attacks portraying him as a traitor working for France. In May 1935, a major reorganisation of the armed forces resulted in Fritsch taking the new title of commander-in-chief of the army (Oberbefehlshaber des Heeres) effective 1 June.

Fritsch supported the Nazi regime but was antagonistic towards attempts to create rivals to the army, especially the SS. Shirer recalled hearing Fritsch make sarcastic remarks about the SS as well as several Nazi leaders from Hitler downward at a parade in Saarbrücken. He was also worried that Hitler would cause a war with the Soviet Union; like most of his fellow officers, he had supported the Weimar Republic's liaison with Moscow. Wette wrote,

it is indisputable that the conservative and nationalistically minded General von Fritsch affirmed the National Socialist state, and he accepted Hitler as a dictator fully and completely. Given this compatibility of outlook, one may doubt whether Fritsch's pronounced anti-Semitism reflected 'political naïveté' as the historian Klaus-Jürgen Müller has asserted [...].

On 20 April 1936, when Blomberg was promoted to field marshal (Generalfeldmarschall), Fritsch received promotion to Blomberg's vacated rank of colonel general (Generaloberst). At this time he was also granted the rank and authority of a Reichsminister but without the formal title. On 30 January 1937, to mark the fourth anniversary of the Nazi regime, Hitler personally presented the Golden Party Badge to the remaining non-Nazi members of the cabinet and the military service heads, including Fritsch, and enrolled him in the party. (Note: His membership number was 3,805,227.)

Fritsch was among the officers present at the Hossbach Conference of 5 November 1937, when Hitler announced that he wanted to go to war as early as 1938. He was very critical of that demand, as he knew the army was not ready. He even went so far as to threaten to resign his command.

== Blomberg–Fritsch Affair ==
Heinrich Himmler and Hermann Göring, inspired by the resignation of Blomberg, accused the unmarried Fritsch of engaging in homosexual activity. Fritsch had never been a womaniser and had preferred to concentrate on his army career. He was forced to resign on 4 February 1938. His replacement, Walther von Brauchitsch, had been recommended for the post by Fritsch. Hitler took advantage of the situation through the replacement of several generals and ministers with Nazi loyalists, which strengthened his control of the German armed forces (Wehrmacht).

It soon became known that the charges were false and an honour court of officers, presided over by Göring himself, examined the Blomberg–Fritsch Affair. Fritsch was acquitted on 18 March, but the damage to his name had been done. The successful annexation of Austria into Greater Germany (Anschluss) of 12 March silenced all critics of Hitler, Göring and Himmler.

Following his acquittal, Fritsch attempted to challenge SS leader Himmler to a duel. Fritsch composed a formal challenge and reportedly practiced his pistol skills in his free time, of which he had plenty as an officer without a command. The letter was given to General Gerd von Rundstedt for delivery, but Rundstedt, seeking to bridge the distrust between the Wehrmacht and SS, ultimately convinced Fritsch to abandon the idea. (Regardless, it is unlikely the encounter could have come about, as Hitler had forbidden highly placed party members, such as Himmler, from dueling.)

Despite the false charges, Fritsch remained loyal to the Nazi regime and maintained his firmly held belief Germany was faced with an international Jewish conspiracy that wanted to ruin the Reich. After the Kristallnacht pogrom of November 1938, Fritsch wrote in a letter to a friend on 22 November, "Of course the battle with international Jewry has now officially begun, and as a natural consequence that will lead to war with England and the United States, the political bastions of the Jews". In a letter to another friend, Baroness Margot von Schutzbar-Milchling, on 11 December 1938, Fritsch wrote:

It is very strange that so many people should regard the future with growing apprehension, in spite of the Führer's indisputable successes in the past.... Soon after the War, I came to the conclusion that we have to be victorious in three battles, if Germany were again to be powerful:
(1) The battle against the working class. Hitler has won this;
(2) Against the Catholic Church, perhaps better expressed as Ultramontanism and
(3) Against the Jews.
We are in the midst of these battles, and the one against the Jews is the most difficult. I hope everyone realizes the intricacies of this campaign".

Fritsch told Ulrich von Hassell, when the latter tried to involve him in an anti-Nazi plot, that Hitler was Germany's destiny and nothing could be done to change that fact.

== World War II and death ==
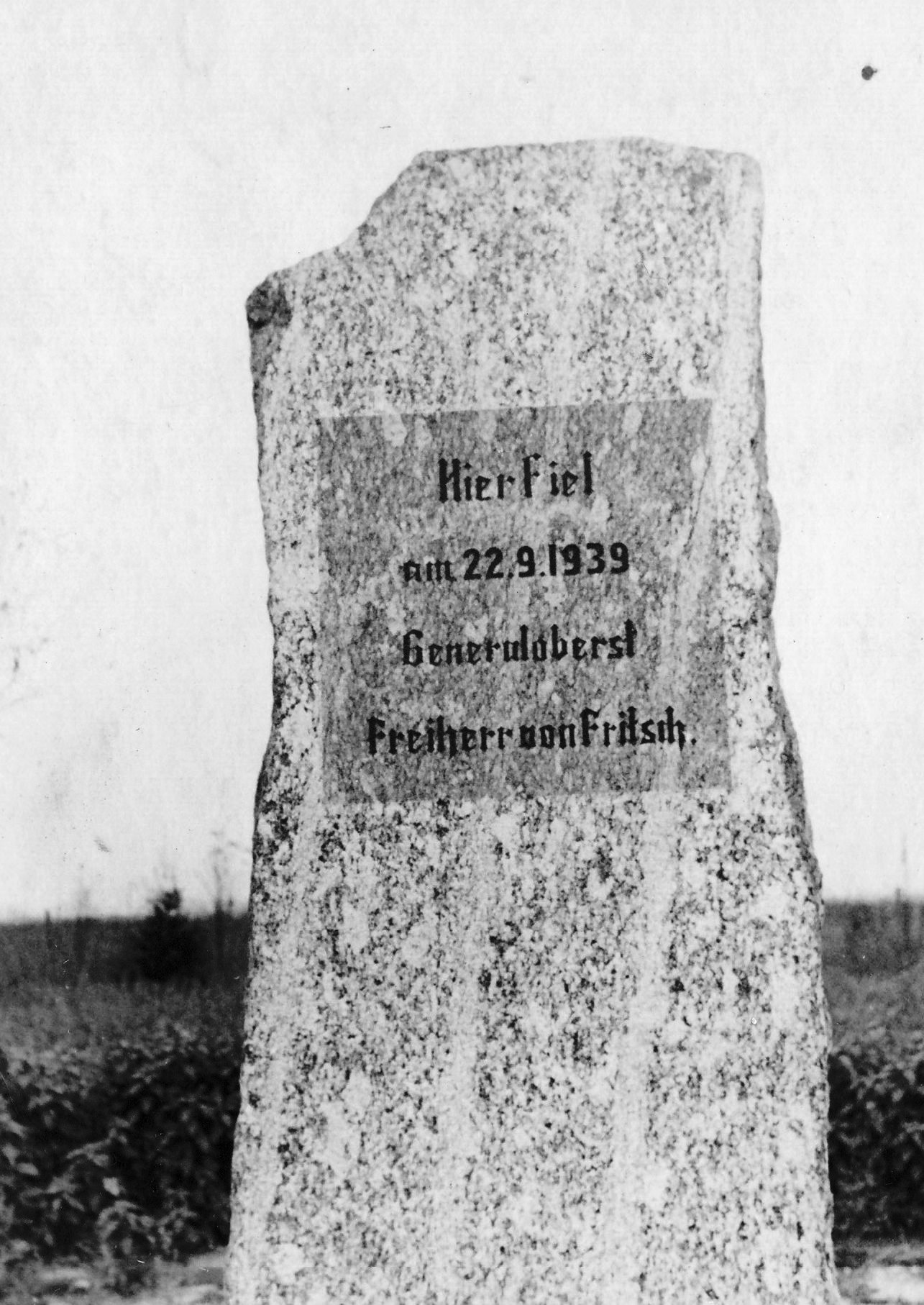
Commemorative stone placed by Germans in the spot where Fritsch died. It was destroyed in 1944 during the Warsaw Uprising.

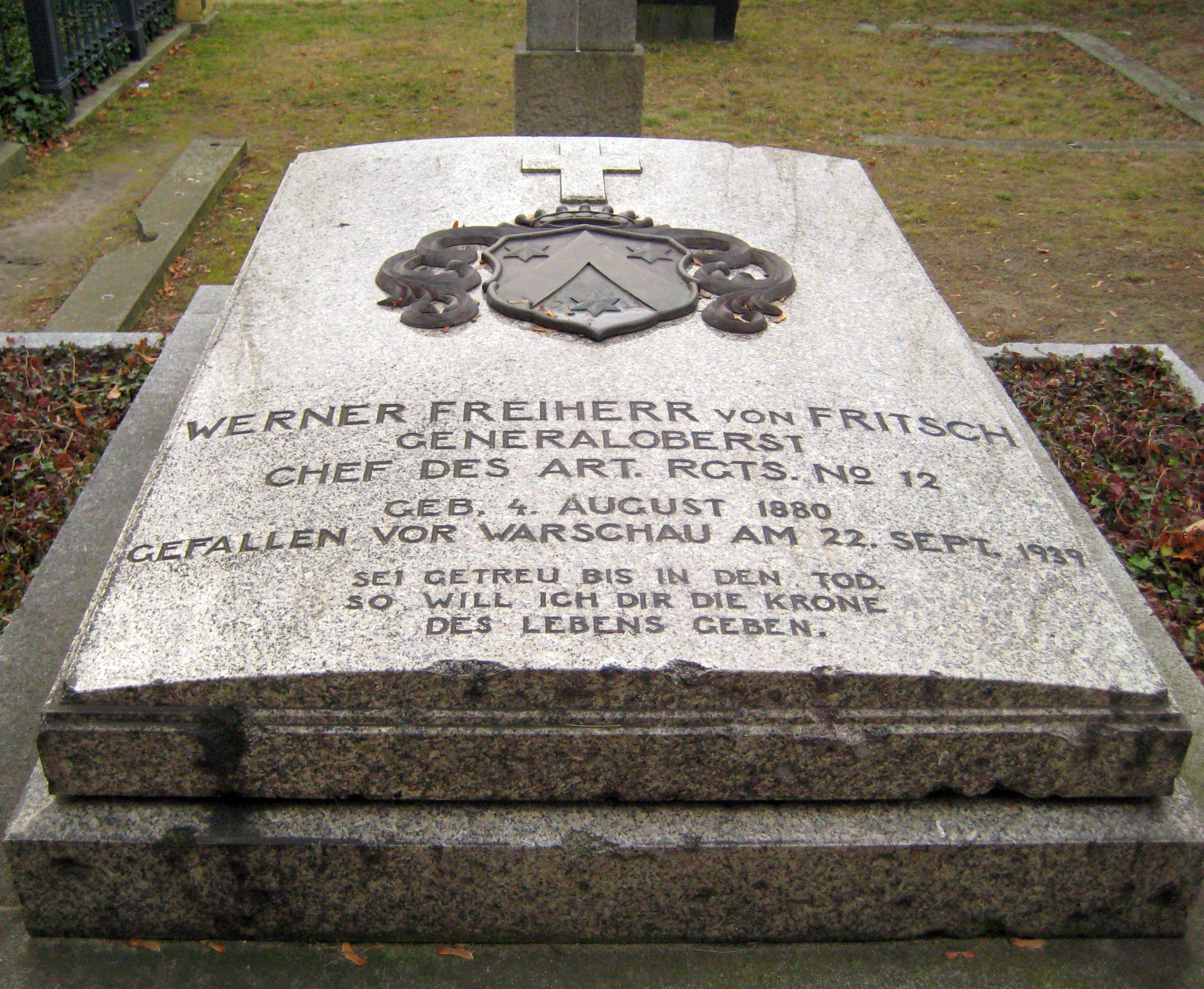
Grave at Invalidenfriedhof

Just before the outbreak of World War II, Fritsch was recalled, and chose to personally inspect the front lines as the "Colonel-in-chief of the 12th Artillery Regiment" during the invasion of Poland, a very unusual activity for someone of his rank. On 22 September 1939, in Targówek during the Siege of Warsaw, a Polish bullet (either a machine gun or a sharpshooter) hit the General and tore an artery in his leg. Lieutenant Rosenhagen, adjutant to Fritsch and an eyewitness to his death, wrote in his original, official report:

In this moment the Herr Generaloberst received a gunshot in his left thigh, a bullet tore an artery. Immediately he fell down. I took off his suspenders to bind the wound. The Herr Generaloberst said: "please leave it", lost consciousness and died, with a foolish grin on his fading face. Only one minute passed between receiving gunshot and death.

Fritsch was the second German general to be killed in combat in World War II – the first being SS commander Wilhelm Fritz von Roettig on 10 September 1939 near Opoczno, Poland. As Fritsch was the second general to be killed in action, the event was closely examined.

The official verdict was that he deliberately sought death. However, according to Field Marshal Wilhelm Keitel (chief of German high command) in his memoirs:

the widespread rumour that Fritsch was so embittered that he had deliberately sought death in action is quite false, according to what the officer who reported Fritsch's fatal injury to the Führer (in my presence) saw with his own eyes: a stray bullet had struck the colonel-general while he was conversing with his staff officers, and within only a few minutes he had bled to death.

Fritsch received a ceremonial state funeral four days later in Berlin. William L. Shirer covered the event in his diary entry dated 26 September 1939:

They buried General von Fritsch here this morning. It rained, it was cold and dark – one of the dreariest days I can remember in Berlin. Hitler did not show up, nor Ribbentrop, nor Himmler, though they all returned to Berlin from the front this afternoon.

== Commemoration ==
Despite the controversy that had been associated with him, the Freiherr von Fritsch Kaserne ('barracks') in Darmstadt was named after Fritsch after his death. The facilities were combined with the adjoining Cambrai Kaserne when the United States Army occupied Darmstadt in 1945. The Cambrai-Fritsch Kaserne was returned to German control in 2008.

== Awards and decorations ==
- Order of the Red Eagle, 4th class
- Order of the Prussian Crown, 4th class
- Knight's Cross with swords of the House Order of Hohenzollern
- Iron Cross (1914), 2nd and 1st Class
- Prussian Service Award Cross
- Military Merit Order of Bavaria, 4th class with swords and crown
- Knight's Cross 1st class with swords and crown of the Albert Order
- Knight's Cross with swords of the Order of the Württemberg Crown
- Friedrich-August-Kreuz
- Knight's Cross 1st class with swords of the Friedrich Order
- Knight's Cross 2nd class of the Hessian Order of Philip the Magnanimous
- Hanseatic Cross of Bremen
- Commander's Cross 2nd class with swords of the Saxe-Ernestine House Order
- Order of the Iron Crown, 3rd class
- Military Merit Cross of Austria-Hungary, 3rd class with war decoration
- Order of the Medjidie, 3rd class with swords
- Gallipoli Star
- Wound Badge (1918) in Black

== Sources ==
- Barnett, Correlli, ed. (1989). Hitler's Generals. New York, NY: Grove Weidenfeld.
- Deutsch, Harold C. (1974). Hitler and His Generals: The Hidden Crisis. January–June 1938. Minneapolis: University of Minnesota. ISBN 0816657440.
- Fritsch, Werner (25 February 2020) [1937-11-07]. Heise, Thomas (ed.). D 81/3+ Besichtigungsbemerkungen 1937 (in German). Norderstedt: Books on Demand. ISBN 978-3-7504-5289-3. OCLC 1155526375.
- Guérin, Daniel (29 June 2005). "Fascism and Big Business (October 1938)". Marxists Internet Archive.
- Keitel, Wilhelm (n.d.). Gorlitz, Walter (ed.). The Memoirs of Field-Marshal Wilhelm Keitel Chief of the German High Command, 1938-1945. Translated by Irving, David. New York, NY: Cooper Square Press.
- MelAfAndez, Juan R. (6 August 2008). "Darmstadt Garrison Bids Germany Farewell". U.S. Army.
- Office of United States Chief of Counsel for Prosecution of Axis Criminality (1946). "Document 2879-PS". Nazi Conspiracy and Aggression. Red Series. Vol. 5. Washington: Office of United States Chief of Counsel for Prosecution of Axis Criminality. LCCN 2011525363. OCLC 315871222.
- Shirer, William Lawrence (1941). Berlin Diary: the Journal of a Foreign Correspondent, 1934–1941. New York: Alfred A. Knopf.
- Shirer, William Lawrence (1960), The Rise and Fall of the Third Reich: A History of Nazi Germany, New York City: Simon & Schuster, ASIN B0766DKDLR, LCCN 60006729, OCLC 1286630, OL 5794925M, Wikidata Q138029595
- "n.t.". Der Spiegel. Vol. 34. 21 August 1948.
- Taylor, Telford (1969). Sword and Swastika: Generals and Nazis in the Third Reich. Chicago: Quadrangle Books. p. 76. ISBN 978-1-566-19746-5.
- Wette, Wolfram (2006). The Wehrmacht. Cambridge: Harvard University Press.
- Wheeler-Bennett, John (1967). The Nemesis of Power: The German Army in Politics 1918–1945. London: Palgrave Macmillan.
