= Piotr Stępień (boxer) =

Polish boxer and kickboxer (born 2001)

- Born: March 6, 2001 (age 25); Opoczno, Poland
- Nationality: Polish
- Height: 1.74 m (5 ft 8 1/2 in)
- Weight: 63 kg (139 lb; 9 st 13 lb)
- Stance: Orthodox
- Fighting out of: Opoczno, Poland
- Team: Underground Fight Club Opoczno; Palestra Fight Team
- Years active: 2020 - present

Professional boxing record
- Total: 8
- Wins: 8
- By knockout: 6
- Losses: 0

Kickboxing record
- Total: 11
- Wins: 11
- By knockout: 4
- Losses: 0
- By knockout: 0
- Draws: 0

Other information
- Boxing record from BoxRec

Piotr Stępień (born March 2001) is a Polish professional boxer and kickboxer. He is the current Republic of Poland International Lightweight Champion, and a former PZKB National Lightweight Champion.

== Kickboxing career ==
=== Early career ===
Stępień made his kickboxing debut on November 14, 2020 against Krzysztof Włodarczyk for the PZKB National Lightweight Championship. Stępień won the fight via Unanimous Decision, and thus won the championship.

His next fight came on November 20, 2021 against Cezary Osieł. Stępień won the fight via Unanimous Decision.

His next fight came on February 5, 2022 against Gennaro Larotonda. Stępień won the fight via Unanimous Decision.

=== Wirtuoz Challenge ===
His next fight came on March 25, 2022 against Adrian Fryska. Stępień won the fight via a first-round knockout.

His next fight came on September 16, 2022 against Artur Setlak. Stępień won the fight via a first-round TKO.

=== Babilon Boxing & K-1 ===
Stępień made his debut under Babilon Boxing & K-1 on February 24, 2023 against Łukasz Łęczycki. Stępień won the fight via a third-round knockout.

His next fight came on May 13, 2023 against Kristian Nguyen. Stępień won the fight via Split Decision.

=== Return to regionals ===
Stępień returned to his native Opoczno, where he faced Szymon Jarząbek on June 23, 2023. Stępień won the fight via a first-round TKO.

=== Return to Wirtuoz Challenge ===
Stępień returned to Wirtuoz Challenge on October 6, 2023 where he faced Rafał Cyrankowski. Stępień won the fight via Unanimous Decision.

=== Return to Babilon Boxing & K-1 ===
Stępień returned to Babilon Boxing & K-1 on February 23, 2024 against Marcin Majewski. Stępień won the fight via Unanimous Decision.

=== Strike King ===
Stępień made his debut under Strike King on October 11, 2024 where he faced Alex Gonzalez. Stępień won the fight via Unanimous Decision.

== Boxing career ==
Stępień made his professional boxing debut on April 26, 2024 against Sergio Gonzalez. Stępień won the fight via a fifth-round knockout.

His next fight came on May 17, 2024 against Roman Senki. Stępień won the fight via a first-round TKO.

His next fight came on March 1, 2025 against Piotr Gudel. Stępień won the fight via a third-round corner retirement.

Stępień fought for the vacant Republic of Poland Youth lightweight championship on May 24, 2025 against Bryan Zapata. Stępień won the fight via a second-round TKO, and thus winning his first boxing championship.

His next fight came on September 27, 2025 against Tomáš Pomacháč. Stępień won the fight via a third-round TKO.

Stępień fought for the vacant Republic of Poland Youth Super lightweight champion on November 29, 2025 against Gabriel Blezień. Stępień won the fight via a fourth-round TKO, winning his second boxing championship.

His next fight came on March 6, 2026, against Bartłomiej Wańczyk. Stępień won the fight via a Unanimous Decision.

In his next fight, he faced Walter Matias Leiva on May 10, 2026, for the vacant Republic of Poland International lightweight title. Stępień won the fight via a first-round knockout, winning his third career championship in the process.

== Championships and accomplishments ==
=== Kickboxing ===
- Polski Związek Kickboxingu
  - PZKB National Lightweight Champion (One time; former)

=== Boxing ===
- Polska Unia Boksu
  - Republic of Poland International Lightweight Champion (One time; current)
  - Republic of Poland Youth Super Lightweight Champion (One time; former)
  - Republic of Poland Youth Lightweight Champion (One time; former)

== Professional boxing record ==
8 fights	8 wins	0 losses
By knockout	7	0
By decision	1	0

No.	Result	Record	Opponent	Type	Round, time	Date	Location	Notes
8	Win	8–0	Walter Matias Leiva	KO	1 (10), 2:05	10 May 2026	Hala Sportowa SP 3, Opoczno, Poland	Won vacant Republic of Poland International lightweight title
7	Win	7–0	Bartłomiej Wańczyk	UD	8	6 Mar 2026	Hotel Terminal, Wrocław, Poland	
6	Win	6–0	Gabriel Blezień	TKO	4 (8), 2:02	29 Nov 2025	KGHM Arena Ślęza Wrocław, Wrocław, Poland	Won vacant Republic of Poland youth super lightweight title
5	Win	5–0	Tomáš Pomacháč	TKO	3 (6), 0:26	27 Sep 2025	Hala Widowiskowo-Sportowa, Ziębice, Poland	
4	Win	4–0	Bryan Zapata	TKO	2 (8), 2:49	24 May 2025	Hala ZSP nr. 1, Opoczno, Poland	Won vacant Republic of Poland youth lightweight title
3	Win	3–0	Piotr Gudel	RTD	3 (6), 3:00	1 Mar 2025	Hala Widowiskowo-Sportowa, ul. Lotnicza 52, Legnica, Poland	
2	Win	2–0	Roman Senki	TKO	1 (6), 0:28	17 May 2024	Hala Sportowa ul. Sosnowa 3, Pionki, Poland	
1	Win	1–0	Sergio Gonzalez	KO	5 (6), 1:45	26 Apr 2024	Hala Sportowa SP 3, Opoczno, Poland	

== Kickboxing and K-1 record ==
Professional kickboxing record
11 Wins (4 (T)KOs), 0 Losses, 0 Draws
Date	Result	Opponent	Event	Location	Method	Round	Time
2024-10-11	Win	(Spain) Alex Gonzalez	Strike King 3	Piotrków Trybunalski, Poland	Decision (Unaninomus)	3	3:00
2024-02-23	Win	(Poland) Marcin Majewski	Babilon Boxing Show & K-1	Nowy Dwór Mazowiecki, Poland	Decision (Unaninomus)	3	3:00
2023-10-06	Win	(Poland) Marcin Majewski	Wirtuoz Challenge 10	Wolbórz, Poland	Decision (Unaninomus)	3	3:00
2023-06-23	Win	(Poland) Szymon Jarząbek	Fighting Challenge Opoczno II	Opoczno, Poland	KO (Head Kick)	1	
2023-05-13	Win	(Slovakia) Kristian Nguyen	Babilon K1 & Boxing Show 2	Ząbki, Poland	Decision (Split)	3	3:00
2023-02-24	Win	(Poland) Łukasz Łęczycki	Babilon K1 & Boxing Show	Nowy Dwór Mazowiecki, Poland	TKO (Liver Punch)	3	2:15
2022-09-16	Win	(Poland) Artur Setlak	Wirtuoz Challenge 9	Wolbórz, Poland	KO (Punches to the Body)	1	
2022-03-25	Win	(Poland) Adrian Fryska	Wirtuoz Challenge 8	Wolbórz, Poland	TKO (Three Knockdown Rule)	1	
2022-02-05	Win	(Argentina) Genaro Larotonda	HFO 11: Bielany	Warsaw, Poland	Decision (Unanimous)	3	3:00
2021-11-20	Win	(Poland) Cezary Osieł	Piaseczno Fight Night X	Piaseczno, Poland	Decision (Unanimous)	3	3:00
2020-11-14	Win	(Poland) Krzysztof Włodarczyk	Piaseczno Fight Night IX	Piaseczno, Poland	Decision (Unanimous)	3	3:00
Wins the PZKB National Lightweight Championship.
