= Włodzimierz Perzyński =

Polish writer and dramatist

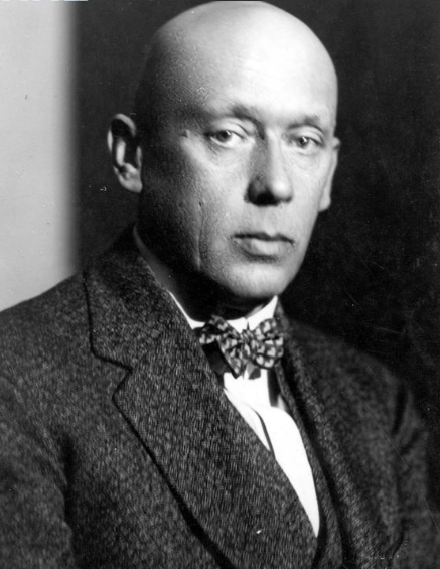
Włodzimierz Perzyński in 1927

Włodzimierz Perzyński (6 July 1877 in Opoczno – 21 October 1930 in Warsaw) was a Polish writer and dramatist, who was a member of the Young Poland movement. His most famous plays include Lekkomyślna siostra (1907), Aszantka (1906), and Szczęście Frania (1906).

Perzyński began to write plays when he was having financial problems. At the instigation of Stanisław Ostrowski, he wrote his first comedy, Reckless sister, which was adopted by Tadeusz Pawlikowski, director of the Lviv city theater in 1904. Among others, it starred Konstancja Bednarzewska, Irena Solska, Ferdynand Feldman, and Karol Adwentowicz. The play was a success. Other theater plays are Aszantka (1906), May Sun (1906), Happiness Frances (1909), Idealists (1909), The History of Joseph (1913), Scarecrow (1916) Politics (1920), Smile of fate (1927), Doctors love (1928), Thank you for your service (1929).

He began writing novels while abroad in the years 1907–1913. He wrote Diary of a hanged man, Spring (1911), Fortitous happiness (1913), Golden interest (1914), Once in a Lifetime (1925). He was also a translator, and translated the works of Chiarelli, Sardou, de Flers, de Croisset, Bourdet and Achard, among others.
