= Opoczno S.A. =

- Industry: Tile manufacture
- Predecessor: Dziewulski i Lange
- Founded: 1886
- Founder: Józef and Władysław Lange with Jan Dziewulski
- Headquarters: Opoczno, Poland
- Key people: Krzysztof Henryk Taler, president
- Number of employees: 2,500

Opoczno S.A. or ZPC Opoczno, known in Polish as the Zespół Zakładów Płytek Ceramicznych Opoczno, is the largest producer of ceramic tiles in Poland. For almost half a century the foundry enjoyed a monopoly status in the local market. Established in the town of Opoczno originally in the mid 19th century, it became the first and largest ceramic tiles manufacturer already in Congress Poland under the Russian partition.

== History ==
The company was formed by brothers Józef and Władysław Lange with businessman Jan Dziewulski. Under the name of Dziewulski i Lange it began producing tiles in 1886. After World War II the foundry was nationalized by the communists and renamed in 1950 as ZPC Opoczno. The Revolutions of 1989 and the fall of totalitarianism in Eastern Europe brought dramatic changes – with introduction of the free market economy – prompting further structural changes. Opoczno S.A. was privatized on September 5, 2000. At present, the majority of shares in the ownership of the company belong to foreign investors.

Opoczno foundry has a staff of 2,500 and in part, the shares of its capital stock are still owned by the state according to Wprost weekly. The Opoczno S.A. Group shareholders used to include: Credit Suisse First Boston Ceramic Partners (Poland) Sarl – 50.2%, the State Treasury – 39.1%, and Opoczno employees – 10.7%. The Sarl consortium sold its shares to Cersanit S.A. (pl) according to Bankier.pl magazine.

== Company history and the Treblinka findings ==
The original Dziewulski & Lange factory of Opoczno received recognition in relation to history of the Holocaust in occupied Poland. The tiles stamped with the D✡L logo were unearthed in 2010 on the grounds of the former Treblinka extermination camp. An archaeological team performing excavations, led by Caroline Sturdy Colls of Staffordshire, explained that the evidence is of paramount importance, because the gas chambers at Treblinka were the only brick structure in the camp. The old Opoczno tiles provided the first physical proof for their existence. The discovery of ceramic bathroom tiles became the subject of the 2014 documentary Treblinka: Hitler's Killing Machine by the Smithsonian Channel.

One of the tiles found during the archaeological dig, providing the first physical evidence for the existence of the gas chambers at Treblinka

The tiles from Opoczno found at Treblinka were erroneously perceived as featuring a Star of David. Further analysis by Polish scientists led to the discovery of the true origins of the star identified as the historic trademark of the company which made the Treblinka tiles. The theory of the Star of David was therefore put to rest. Even though all Treblinka tiles display a logo, it is not known what the meaning of the star might have been. Lange is not a Slavic surname. Once established, the logo remained in use during the interwar period. The foundry survived the 1939 invasion of Poland and remained in private hands until 1949. During the darkest years of Stalinism in Poland it was appropriated by the state and renamed. Only after the Treblinka discovery, the star became the subject of intense scrutiny; described as the mullet of six points, pierced () similar to a Star of David. Archaeological assessments published by Staffordshire in the period following the Smithsonian documentary no longer identified the logo as Jewish in origin, an issue of central importance previously.

Treblinka extermination camp built by Nazi Germany in occupied Poland during World War II operated between July 23, 1942, and October 19, 1943, as part of Operation Reinhard, the most deadly phase of the Final Solution. During this time, between 700,000 and 900,000 Polish Jews were killed in its gas chambers disguised as shower-rooms complete with ceramic bathroom tiles. More victims were gassed at Treblinka than at any other Nazi extermination camp apart from Auschwitz.

== See also ==
- Economy of Poland
