= Wilhelm Fritz von Roettig =

German Order Police general and SS officer

- Born: Georg Friedrich Wilhelm Roettig; 25 July 1888; Mühlhausen, Province of Saxony, Kingdom of Prussia, German Empire
- Died: 10 September 1939 (aged 51) near Opoczno, Poland
- Relatives: Otto Roettig, brother
- Military career
- Allegiance: German Empire; Nazi Germany
- Branch: Imperial German Army; Prussian police Ordnungspolizei; SS
- Rank: Generalmajor der Ordnungspolizei; SS-Brigadeführer (posthumous)
- Commands: General Inspector of the Gendarmerie and Municipal Schutzpolizei
- Conflicts: World War I Invasion of Poland

General Wilhelm Roettig

Wilhelm Fritz von Roettig (baptised Georg Friedrich Wilhelm Roettig; 25 July 1888 – 10 September 1939) was a German police official and SS officer. He held the rank of Generalmajor der Ordnungspolizei and served as General Inspector of the Gendarmerie and Municipal Schutzpolizei in the Ordnungspolizei. His rank of SS-Brigadeführer was posthumous.

Roettig was killed near Opoczno during the Invasion of Poland on 10 September 1939, after his staff car was ambushed by Polish troops. He is commonly described as the first German general officer killed during the Second World War.

== Career ==
Roettig was born in Mühlhausen in the Province of Saxony on 25 July 1888. He was the son of the merchant Friedrich Roettig and his wife Pauline, née Werner. His brother Otto Roettig later became a German general of infantry.

Roettig served in the Imperial German Army during the First World War and received several decorations. After the war, he entered the Prussian police service. From 1919 he served in the Prussian Landjägerei, where he held the ranks of captain and major. In 1930, he was promoted to lieutenant colonel.

From 1933 to 1935, Roettig served in the Prussian Landespolizei. Between 1935 and 1937, he commanded the Gendarmerie. In April 1937, he became Generalinspekteur der Gendarmerie und Schutzpolizei der Gemeinden, or General Inspector of the Gendarmerie and Municipal Schutzpolizei. In July 1938, he was promoted to Generalmajor der Ordnungspolizei.

== Death in Poland ==
Roettig took part in the German invasion of Poland in September 1939. On 10 September, at about 14:15, his staff car was ambushed near Opoczno by Polish troops. The force involved is usually identified as elements of the Polish 19th Infantry Division under Colonel Jan Kruk-Śmigła. Roettig was severely wounded and died near the site of the attack.

Roettig's death occurred during the rapid movement of German forces through central Poland, while Polish formations that had been broken or displaced in earlier fighting continued to operate against German columns and rear-area traffic. His death was later noted because it made him the first German general officer killed during the Second World War.

== Aftermath ==
Two days after Roettig's death, German troops killed Jewish civilians in Końskie after forcing them to dig graves for German dead. The killings have been associated in several accounts with German claims about the mutilation of German bodies and with retaliation for the deaths of Roettig and members of his entourage. Other accounts treat the precise connection between Roettig's death and the Końskie massacre as uncertain.

During the German occupation of Prague, a street in the city was named after Roettig.

== Bibliography ==
- Böhler, Jochen (2009). Zbrodnie Wehrmachtu w Polsce: wrzesień 1939, wojna totalna (in Polish). Kraków: Wydawnictwo Znak. ISBN 978-83-240-1225-1.
- Čarek, Jiří (1958). Ulicemi města Prahy od 14. století do dneška: názvy mostů, nábřeží, náměstí, ostrovů, sadů a ulic hlavního města Prahy, jejich změny a výklad (in Czech). Prague: Orbis.
- Forczyk, Robert (2019). Case White: The Invasion of Poland 1939. Oxford: Osprey Publishing. ISBN 978-1-4728-3494-2.
- Hischak, Thomas S. (2017). 1939: Hollywood's Greatest Year. Rowman & Littlefield. ISBN 978-1-4422-7805-9.
- Lemay, Benoît (2010). Erich von Manstein: Hitler's Master Strategist. Casemate. ISBN 978-1-935149-55-2.
- Neufeldt, Hans-Joachim; Huck, Jürgen; Tessin, Georg (1957). Zur Geschichte der Ordnungspolizei 1936–1945. Schriften des Bundesarchivs (in German). Vol. 3. Boppard am Rhein: Harald Boldt Verlag.
- Petropoulos, Jonathan (2014). Artists Under Hitler: Collaboration and Survival in Nazi Germany. New Haven: Yale University Press. ISBN 978-0-300-21061-3.
- Schulz, Andreas; Zinke, Dieter (2009). Die Generale der Waffen-SS und der Polizei 1933–1945. Deutschlands Generale und Admirale, Teil V (in German). Vol. 4: Podzun–Schimana. Bissendorf: Biblio-Verlag. ISBN 978-3-7648-2587-4.
- Wardzyńska, Maria (2009). Był rok 1939: operacja niemieckiej policji bezpieczeństwa w Polsce. Intelligenzaktion (in Polish). Warsaw: Instytut Pamięci Narodowej. ISBN 978-83-7629-063-8.

== See also ==
- Invasion of Poland
- Końskie massacre
- Ordnungspolizei
