= Treblinka, Masovian Voivodeship =

Treblinka
- Village
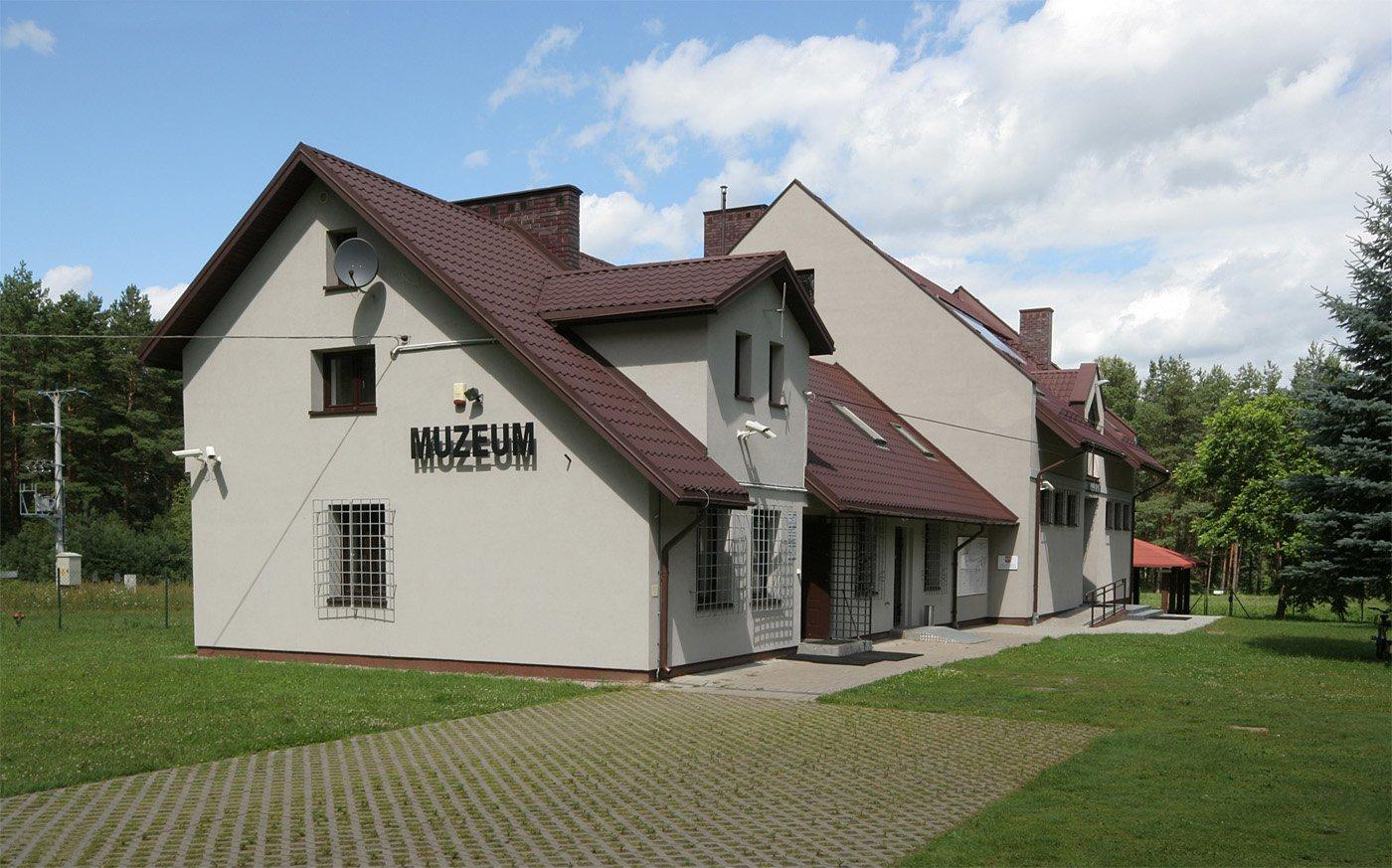
- Treblinka extermination camp museum

- Location within Poland
- Coordinates: 52°39′30″N 22°01′15″E
- Country: Poland
- Voivodeship: Masovian
- County: Ostrów
- Gmina: Małkinia Górna
- Population: 330

Treblinka (Polish pronunciation: [trɛˈblinka]) is a village located in eastern Poland, situated in the present-day district of Gmina Małkinia Górna, within Ostrów County in Masovian Voivodeship, some 80 kilometres (50 miles) northeast of Warsaw. The village lies close to the Bug River. It has 350 inhabitants.

It is known as the site during World War II of one of the Nazi extermination camps, named after the village. An estimated 850,000 people were murdered here during the Holocaust in Poland, from the summer of 1942 to October 1943. In addition, the Treblinka I Arbeitslager, a forced labor camp, had operated about six miles away, from June 1941 to 23 July 1944. During this period, more than 10,000 prisoners are estimated to have died from executions, malnutrition, disease and mistreatment.

== World War II history ==
Treblinka was the location of Treblinka extermination camp, where an estimated 850,000 people were systematically murdered during the Holocaust in Poland. About 800,000 of them were Polish Jews.

The first deportations took place in the course of the Grossaktion Warsaw with about 254,000 Warsaw Ghetto inmates brought in to their deaths in Holocaust trains in the summer of 1942. At the layover yard of Treblinka railway station, the wagons waiting for "processing" were witnessed by Franciszek Ząbecki. During the early period of the camp's operation, when thousands of dead bodies of victims were left unburied, the putrid odor of decaying human remains could be smelled for approximately 10 kilometers (6.2 mi) in every direction. It was evident that mass extermination was taking place at the camp, which caused panic among the villagers.

The onset of the Warsaw Ghetto Uprising inspired renewed hopes for an escape among the Treblinka Sonderkommandos. On 19 April 1943, one of the last Jewish transports of 7,000 victims, along with the Warsaw insurgents, were brought in for gassing. Soon after the first prisoner uprising at a death camp against the SS erupted on 2 August 1943, under the leadership of former Polish Army officer Dr. Berek Lajcher. Some of these prisoners were aided in escaping across the Bug River by the Polish resistance, but few survived.

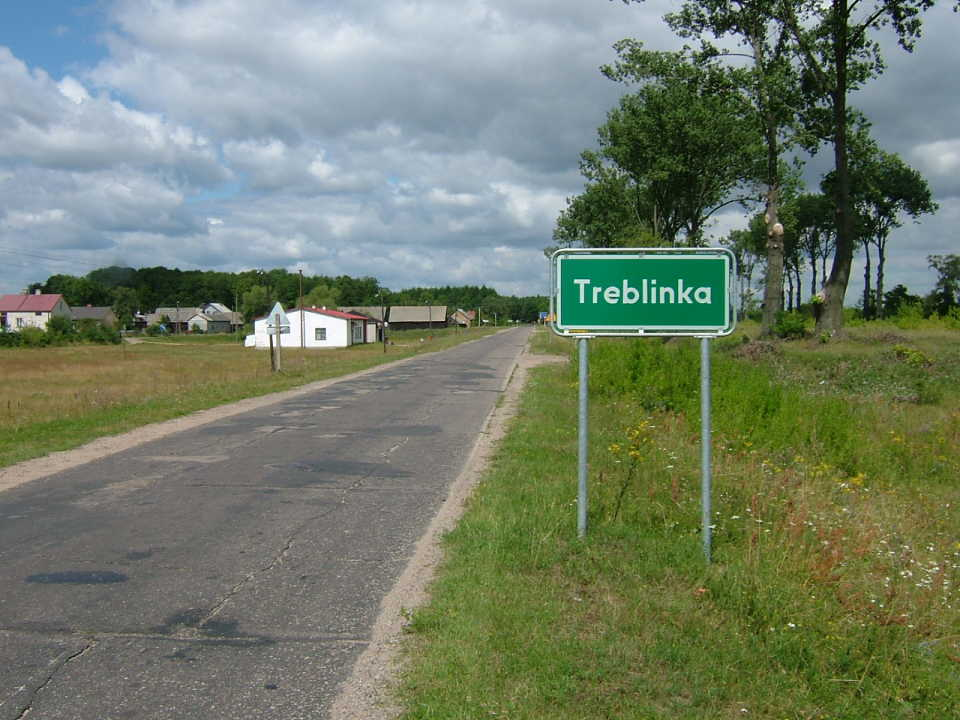
The Treblinka village sign, looking north towards Małkinia

The first commandant of the camp, from 11 July 1942 until 31 August 1942, was Irmfried Eberl, relieved of his duties for not being efficient and secretive enough about the camp's murder operation. He was succeeded by Franz Stangl (previously the commandant of Sobibor extermination camp) as the second commandant of Treblinka II Vernichtungslager from 1 September 1942 until the 1943 Jewish uprising.

The Nazi hierarchy took measures to modify the killing process under Stangl, who built more efficient gas chambers and massive cremation pyres for the incineration of corpses. When the Treblinka death camp ended operations in October 1943, the Nazis attempted (in vain) to remove all evidence of its existence and the mass murder carried out there. Relatively little physical evidence remains. It can be examined at the Treblinka Museum, which is led by Edward Kopówka. The number of visitors there has been steadily growing.

An earlier forced-labor camp known as Treblinka I Arbeitslager, equipped with heavy machinery, was located 6 kilometres (3.7 mi) from Treblinka. Between June 1941 and 23 July 1944, more than half of its 20,000 inmates mining gravel for the German military road construction, died from summary executions, hunger, disease, and mistreatment under Commandant Theodor van Eupen.

== Treblinka extermination camp museum ==
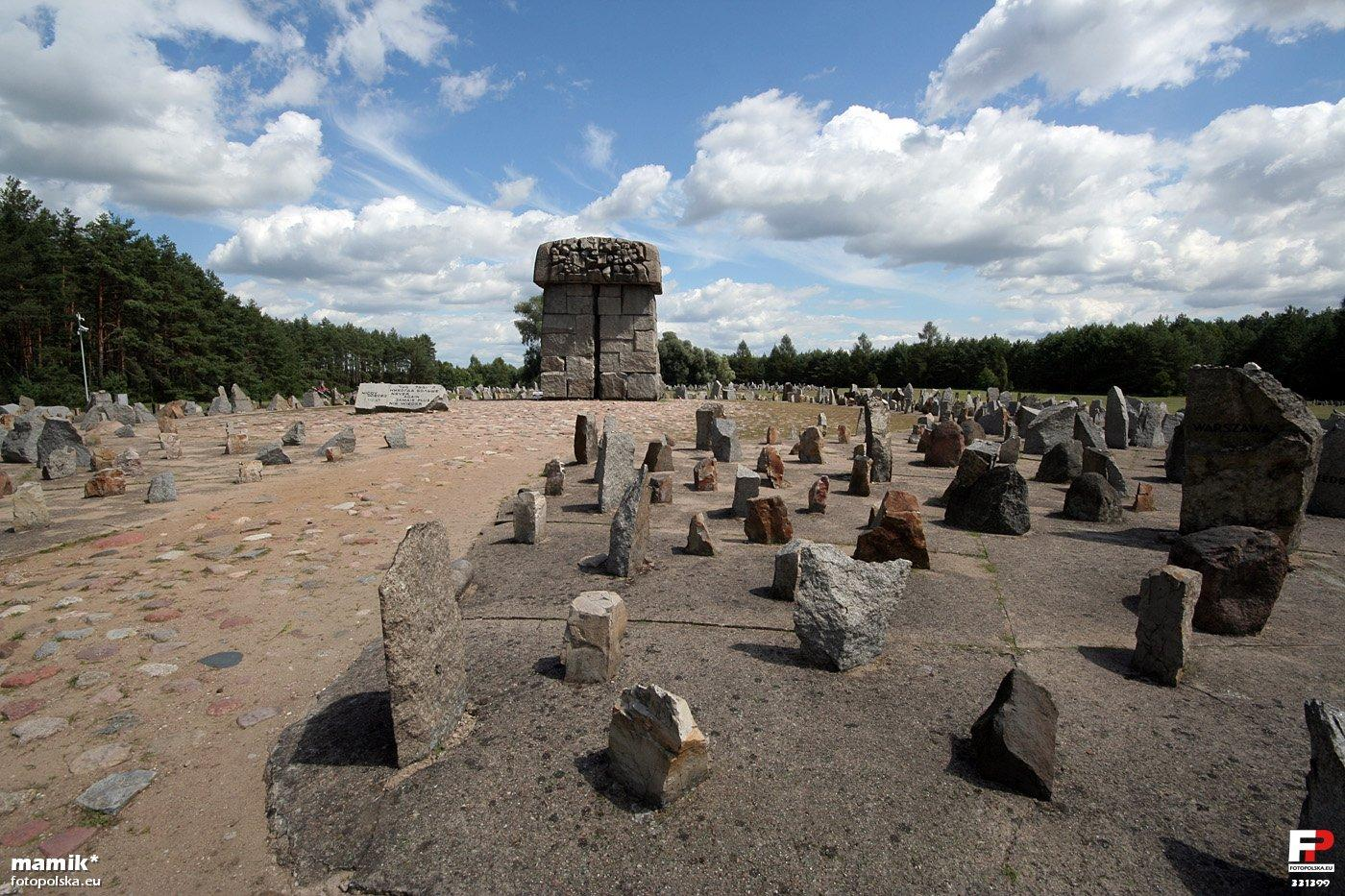
Memorial at Treblinka II, with 17,000 quarry stones symbolising gravestones.

The construction of a stone monument with abstract reliefs and Jewish symbols was inaugurated on 21 April 1958 based on a design by sculptor Franciszek Duszeńko. He expressed the European trend toward stylized and avant-garde forms. The monument was unveiled by Zenon Kliszko, the Marshal of the Sejm of the Republic of Poland on 10 May 1964; attendees included survivors of the Treblinka uprising from Israel, France, Czechoslovakia, and Poland. The official ceremony was attended by 30,000 people, when Treblinka was declared a national monument of martyrology. (Note: Translation from Polish: The name of the Mausoleum of the Fight and Martyrdom was introduced during the official unveiling of the monument which took place on 10 May 1964. The event was attended by 30,000 people. ... Original: "Oficjalne odsłonięcie pomnika odbyło się 10 maja 1964 r. Przyjęto wtedy nazwę tego miejsca – 'Mauzoleum Walki i Męczeństwa w Treblince'. ... Odsłonięcia dokonał wicemarszałek Sejmu PRL – Zenon Kliszko. Wśród zebranych byli więźniowie Treblinki II: Jankiel Wiernik z Izraela, Richard Glazar z Czechosłowacji, Berl Duszkiewicz z Francji i Zenon Gołaszewski z Polski.")

The camp custodian's house (built nearby in 1960) (Note: The custodian and the first director of the Treblinka camp museum was Tadeusz Kiryluk, who was originally from Wólka Okrąglik.) was adapted as an exhibition space following the collapse of the Soviet Union in 1989. Since the late 20th century, the number of visitors coming to Treblinka from abroad has steadily increased. An exhibition centre at the former camp opened in 2006. It was later expanded and made into a branch of the Siedlce Regional Museum, under Dr Edward Kopówka.
