= Edward Kopówka =

Polish writer and historian

- Born: 12 October 1963 (age 62)
- Education: Podlasie Academy
- Occupation: Historian
- Known for: Holocaust research

Edward Kopówka (born 12 October 1963) is a Polish writer and historian, graduate of the Faculty of History at the Podlasie Academy in Siedlce, political and social activist known for his active participation in the democratic process beginning with the so-called Second circulation publishing of delegalized books under the Communist rule. Following the imposition of Martial law in 1981 Kopówka became member of the Independent Students' Union branch of Solidarity, the first non–communist workers union in Warsaw Pact history. In 1985–88 he served as founder, editor-in-chief and production manager for the unofficial Grzegorz Przemyk Publishing named after the young Polish poet murdered by the Communist Milicja Obywatelska. Kopówka supported himself financially by working as history teacher at elementary schools in Siedlce and its vicinity, and after the fall of communism, as clerk at the Office for Financial Control in 1993–96. Kopówka received his Ph.D degree in 2009. He is the Senior Curator of the Treblinka extermination camp museum in Treblinka with certification from the Ministry of Culture. In 2011 he was awarded the Knight's Cross of the Order of Polonia Restituta, one of Poland's highest honours.

== Writings ==
Front cover of Dam im imię na wieki (I will give them an everlasting name. Isaiah 56:5) based on research by Edward Kopówka at the Treblinka extermination camp Museum

Edward Kopówka is the co-author of two virtual encyclopedias of the lesser-known chapters of Poland's World War II history including Dam im imię na wieki (I will give them an everlasting name, 2011) written with Paweł Rytel-Andrianik, the result of over a dozen years of historical studies at the Treblinka Museum; as well as Niemieckie miejsca zagłady w Polsce (The Nazi German Extermination Sites in Poland, 2007) photo-anthology of six extermination camps operating in occupied Poland in 1941-45 with rare photography, recent findings and scientific commentary.

The book about Treblinka reveals, for the first time, the names of nearly 5,000 notable individuals including over 335 Polish Righteous among the Nations from the area and many hundreds of Polish rescuers of Jews living in villages surrounding the camp, risking their own lives to save them in stark contrast to some of the more controversial aspects of contemporary literature on the subject. In his preface Prof. Antony Polonsky from the United States Holocaust Memorial Museum noted, that even though hundreds of rescuers living around Treblinka in the course of Operation Reinhard were bestowed the medals of the Righteous by Yad Vashem, many more were never recognized as such until the publication of this book.

== Works ==
- Edward Kopówka, Memento mori (1985), Wydawnictwo im. Grzegorza Przemyka publishing
- Edward Kopówka, Wędrówki neofity (1988), Wydawnictwo im. Grzegorza Przemyka, PBL 1637
- Edward Kopówka, Plan symbolicznych kamieni (1999), transl. Michael Tregenza, Muzeum Walki i Męczeństwa, ISBN 8390526425
- Edward Kopówka, Bojkownikom o niepodległość cześć! Miejsca pamięci... (2001), PTTK
- Edward Kopówka, Żydzi Siedleccy (2002), OCLC 241487812
- Edward Kopówka, Treblinka nigdy więcej (2002), OCLC 241487812
- Edward Kopówka, Stalag 366 Siedlce (2004), OCLC 241487812
- Edward Kopówka, with P. Tołwiński, Treblinka: kamienie milczą - ja pamiętam (2007), Muzeum Regionalne w Siedlcach, ISBN 8388761080
- Edward Kopówka, Żydzi w Siedlcach 1850-1945 (2009), OCLC 241487812
- Edward Kopówka, with P. Rytel-Andrianik, Dam im imię na wieki (I will give them an everlasting name. Isaiah 56:5) Drohiczyńskie Towarzystwo Naukowe [The Drohiczyn Scientific Society] 2011, ISBN 978-83-7257-496-1, "with list of Catholic rescuers of Jews along deportation route to Treblinka, selected testimonies, bibliography, alphabetical indexes, photographs, English language summaries by Holocaust scholars, and forewords including one by Prof. Antony Polonsky."
- Edward Kopówka, with J. Lachendro, J. Kiełboń, R. Kuwałek, M. Bem, Ł. Pawlicka-Nowak, Niemieckie miejsca zagłady w Polsce
