= Opoczno =

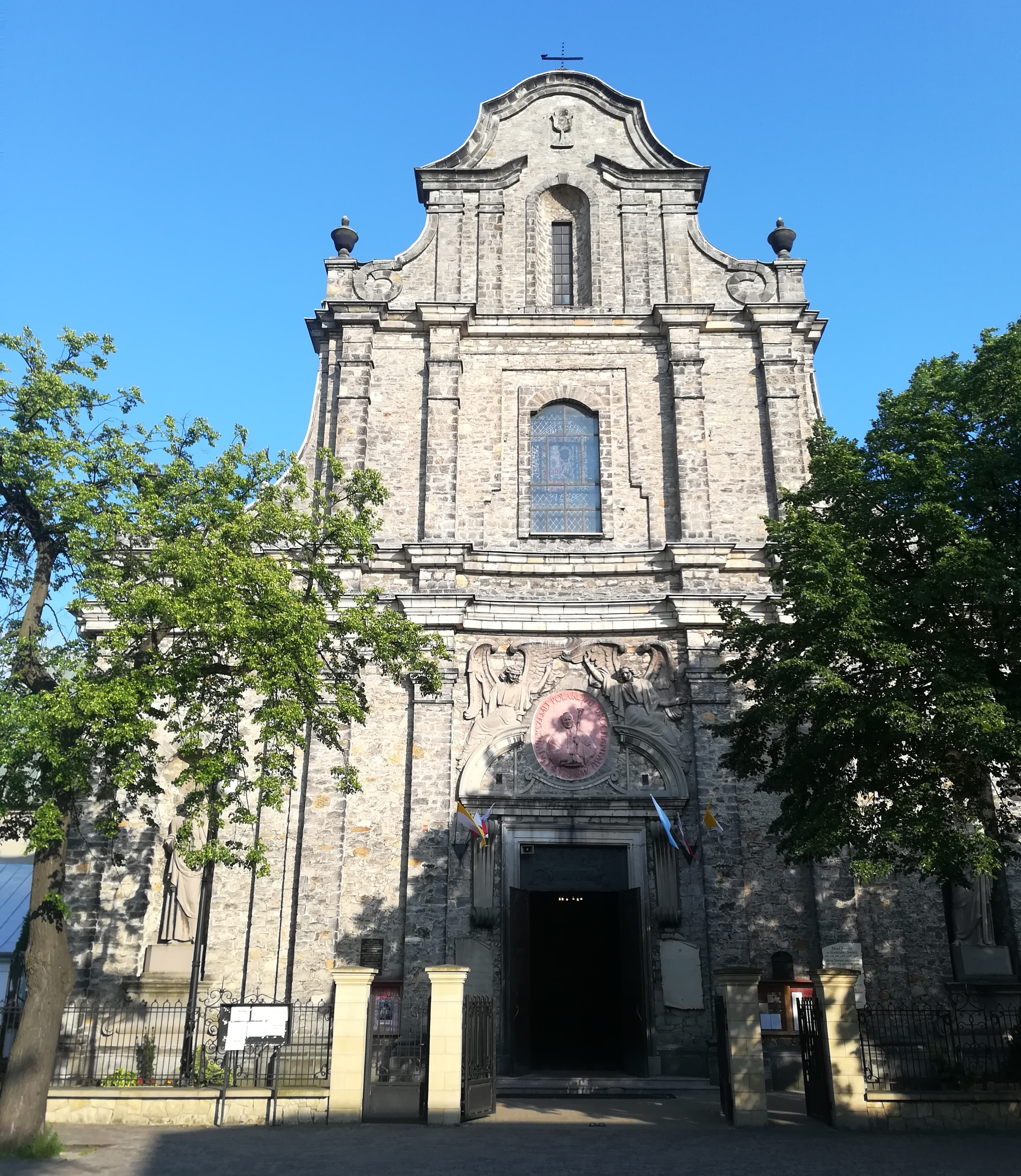
- St. Bartholomew's Church in Opoczno

- Flag Coat of arms

- Location within Poland
- Coordinates: 51°22′38″N 20°17′13″E
- Country: Poland
- Voivodeship: Łódź Voivodeship
- County: Opoczno
- Gmina: Opoczno

Government
  - Mayor: Michał Konecki

Area
  - Total: 23.91 km^{2} (9.23 sq mi)
- Elevation: 190 m (620 ft)

Population (31 December 2020)
  - Total: 20,746 ▼
  - Density: 867.7/km^{2} (2,247/sq mi)
- Time zone: UTC+1 (CET)
  - Summer (DST): UTC+2 (CEST)
- Postal code: 26–300
- Vehicle registration: EOP
- Website: http://www.opoczno.pl

Opoczno ([ɔˈpɔt͡ʂnɔ]) is a town in south-central Poland, seat of Opoczno County in the Łódź Voivodeship.

Founded in the Middle Ages, Opoczno is a former royal town of Poland, which used to be one of the most important urban centers of northwestern Lesser Poland. It prospered as a trade center due to its location at the intersection of important trade routes. Currently, Opoczno is an important road and rail junction; its patron saint is Saint Cecilia, and the town is famous across Poland for its folklore and ceramics manufacturing.

== Location ==
Opoczno lies on the Wąglanka river, in northwestern corner of historic Lesser Poland, on the boundary between Lesser Polish Upland, and Mazovian Lowland. On December 31, 2020, its population was 20,746. The town and its commune have a total area of 190 km2, which makes it one of the largest communes in the voivodeship. In the Polish–Lithuanian Commonwealth, Opoczno was part of Sandomierz Voivodeship, and for centuries was the seat of a large county; in the Second Polish Republic (and from 1950 to 1975), it belonged to Kielce Voivodeship until 1 April 1938 and to Łódź Voivodeship after that.

== Transport ==
The town is an important communication hub. It lies near the Central Rail Line, which connects Silesia and Kraków with Warsaw. Opoczno has a rail station, along the line nr. 25, with connections to Tomaszów Mazowiecki and Skarżysko-Kamienna. Furthermore, the town lies along National Road Nr. 12 (future Expressway S12), which creates a connection between western and eastern parts of Poland, and has a good connection with the nearby A1 Motorway.

== History ==
=== Kingdom of Poland ===
First mention of Opoczno comes from 1284, when Prince Leszek II the Black wrote in documents that the village belonged to the Sandomierz Collegiate church. According to historian F. Kiryk, the history of Opoczno as a town date from the mid-13th century, when it was granted town charter by Duke of Sandomierz, Bolesław V the Chaste. For unknown reason, Opoczno declined in the late 13th century, and turned into a village called Staromieście or Old Opoczno.

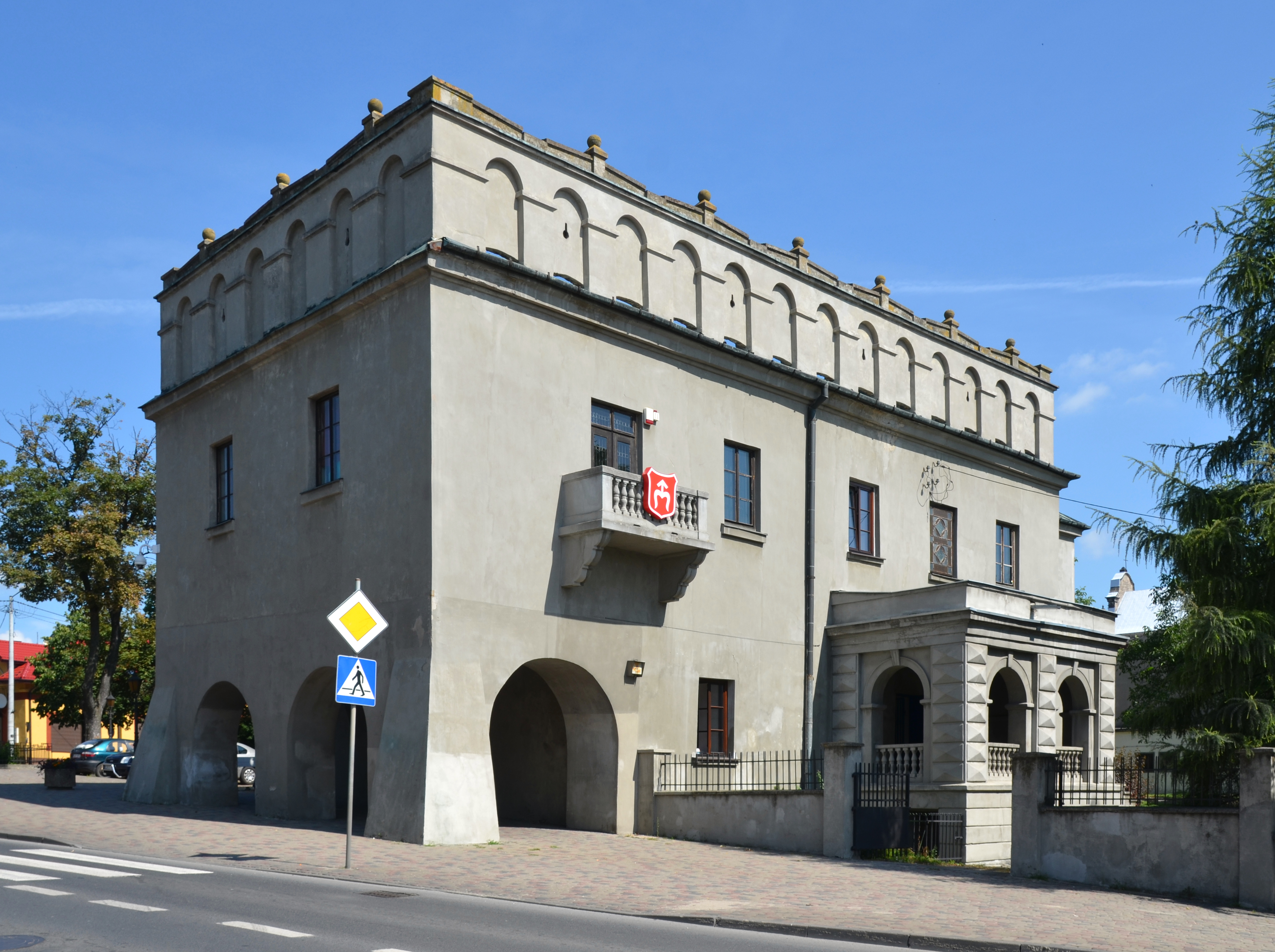
Opoczno Castle

The prosperity for Opoczno began during the reign of King Casimir III the Great. In the year 1347 he decided to move the village to another location, and to found the so-called New Town, located southwest of Staromieście. The New Opoczno had the original area of 6 hectares, and was surrounded with a defensive wall. Staromieście, together with the ancient Mary Magdalene church remained outside of the wall. A new church of St. Bartholomew was built, together with a royal castle, located in southwestern part of the town. Opoczno gained its Magdeburg rights in 1365, and its first starosta was Sobek z Wyszkowic. The defensive wall had the length of 940 meters, with two gates. Opoczno quickly developed, due to convenient location along two busy merchant routes – from Kyiv to Wrocław, and from Toruń to Sandomierz. According to legend, King Kazimierz Wielki favored Opoczno over other towns because it was the birthplace of his legendary mistress Esterka. In the second half of the 14th century Opoczno prospered, and in the 1360s, it was named the capital of a newly created county, which meant that it was no longer subjected to the Castellany of Żarnów. In ca. 1405, the complex of a hospital together with a Holy Spirit church was built. Opoczno was a county seat and royal town administratively located in the Sandomierz Voivodeship in the Lesser Poland Province.

During the Polish Golden Age, good times continued, as both in the Kingdom of Poland and the Polish–Lithuanian Commonwealth, Opoczno was one of the most important urban centers of the Sandomierz Voivodeship. In 1405, a hospital was opened here, and in 1550, with the permission of King Sigismund II Augustus, waterworks were built. In 1599, the third gate in the defensive wall was added. At that time, Opoczno had as many as 90 artisans, with several guilds, such as shoemakers, blacksmiths, saddlers, and coppersmiths. In 1646, a synagogue was opened for the Jewish minority.

The period of prosperity came to an end during the Swedish invasion of Poland (1655–1660), when Opoczno together with its castle was burned to the ground by the invaders, and most of its inhabitants were murdered. Several skirmishes and battles between Poles and Swedish invaders took place at that time in Opoczno County. On September 9, 1655, the division of Stefan Czarniecki attacked Swedish reiters near Inowłódz. Three days later, the Poles attacked Swedish units under Arvid Wittenberg, which were resting by Opoczno. On September 16, 1655, the Battle of Żarnów took place, which resulted in Polish defeat. After the invasion, the destruction of Opoczno was complete, with only 15 houses still standing in the town in 1660. All artisans were killed, and the development of the town was stopped for many years. Similar was the fate of other towns of the county; in Drzewica, only 21 houses remained, and 22 in Odrzywół.

=== 19th century ===
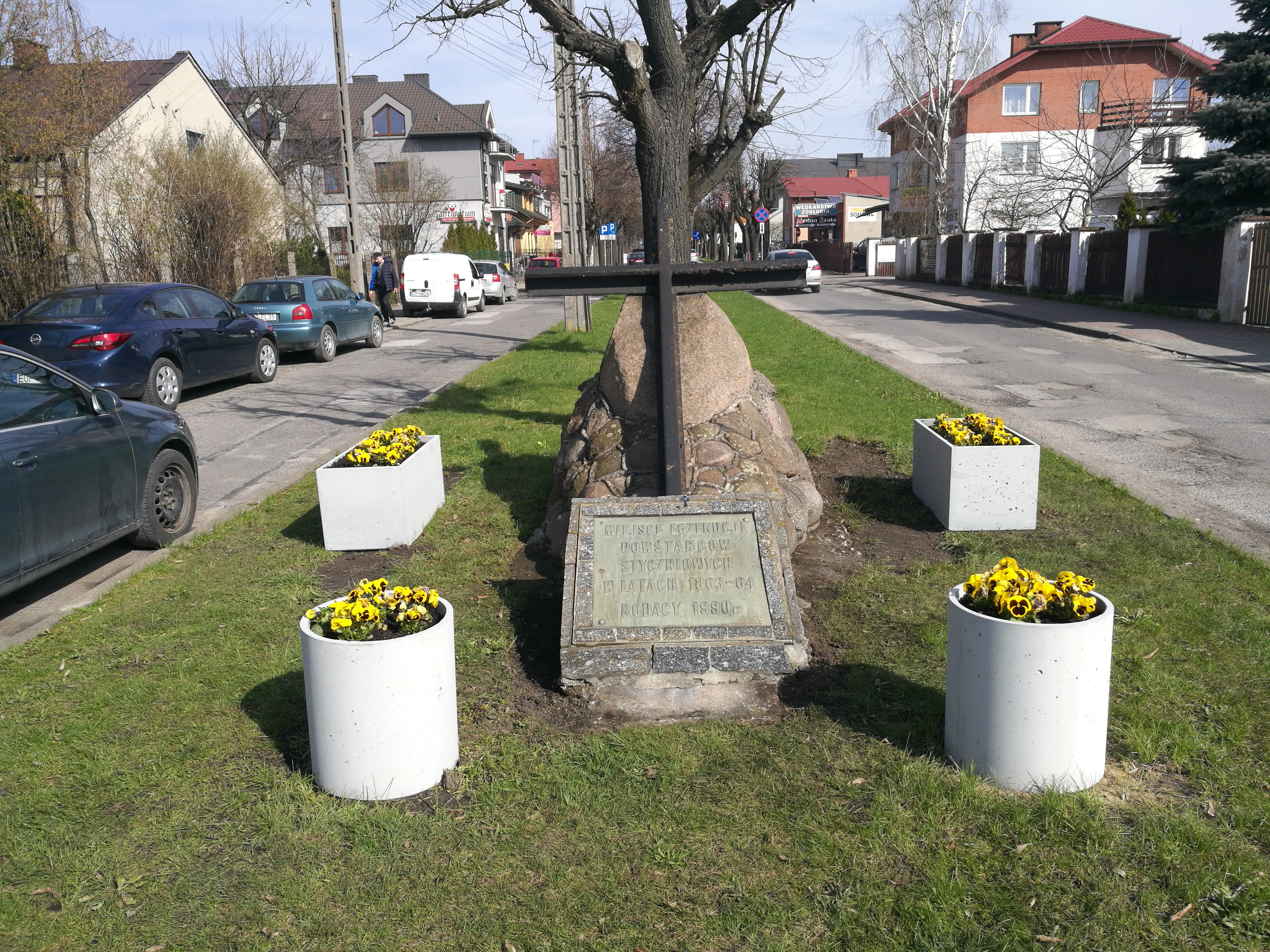
Memorial at the site of Russian executions of Polish insurgents in 1863–1864

Following the Third Partition of Poland, the town was annexed by the Habsburg Empire. After the Polish victory in the Austro-Polish War of 1809, it was regained by Poles and included within the short-lived Duchy of Warsaw, and after its dissolution in 1815, it became part of Russian-controlled Congress Poland. At that time, the town was divided into Catholic and Jewish districts. The population was decimated by frequent outbreaks of cholera, which returned several times until as late as the 1890s. In 1834, the Opoczno County was re-created, and until World War I, Opoczno belonged to Radom Governorate. In 1828, the population of the town was app. 3,500, with 342 houses. Both Polish rebellions in Congress Poland (November Uprising and January Uprising) resulted in Tsarist repressions, which were particularly hard in the 1860s. Opoczno was one of major center of the insurrection, and the town was temporarily captured by the rebels on January 31, 1863. In early 1863, and in the summer of that year, several skirmishes took place here

In the late 19th century, the process of industrialization and development began, spurred by the construction of a rail line from Koluszki to Skarżysko-Kamienna (1885). Several new businesses and shops opened, with the largest one being the tile manufacturer Dziewulski i Lange (D✡L), which today is known as Opoczno S.A. founded in Congress Poland by Jan Dziewulski with brothers Józef and Władysław Lange in 1883–86. In the early stages of World War I, heavy fighting took place here between Austro-German and Russian units. On May 15, 1915, Austrian troops entered Opoczno, together with Polish Legionnaires of Józef Piłsudski. The Austrians, among whom were many Czech soldiers, surrendered without fighting in October 1918.

=== 20th century ===
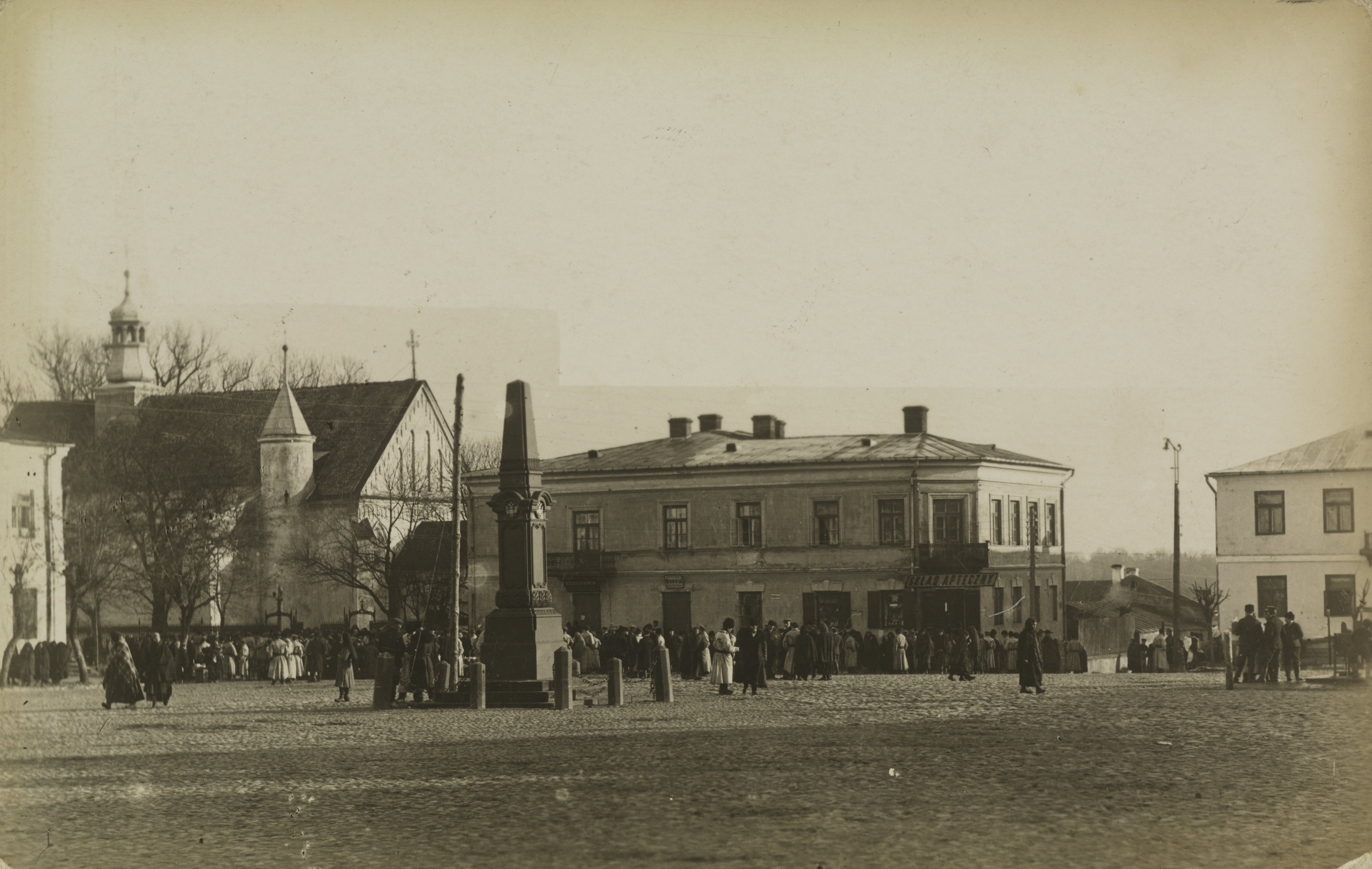
Opoczno in the 1920s

By the early 20th century, the town had a hospital, a library, schools, a rail station (built in 1885), a mail office, a telegraph station, administrative offices, churches and a synagogue. Also, at that time the royal castle, destroyed by the Swedes in the 1650s, was rebuilt. On August 2, 1919, Opoczno was attached to Kielce Voivodeship, where it remained until March 31, 1939, when it was transferred to Łódź Voivodeship (see Territorial changes of Polish Voivodeships on April 1, 1938). Before the outbreak of World War II, the population of the town was app. 11,000.

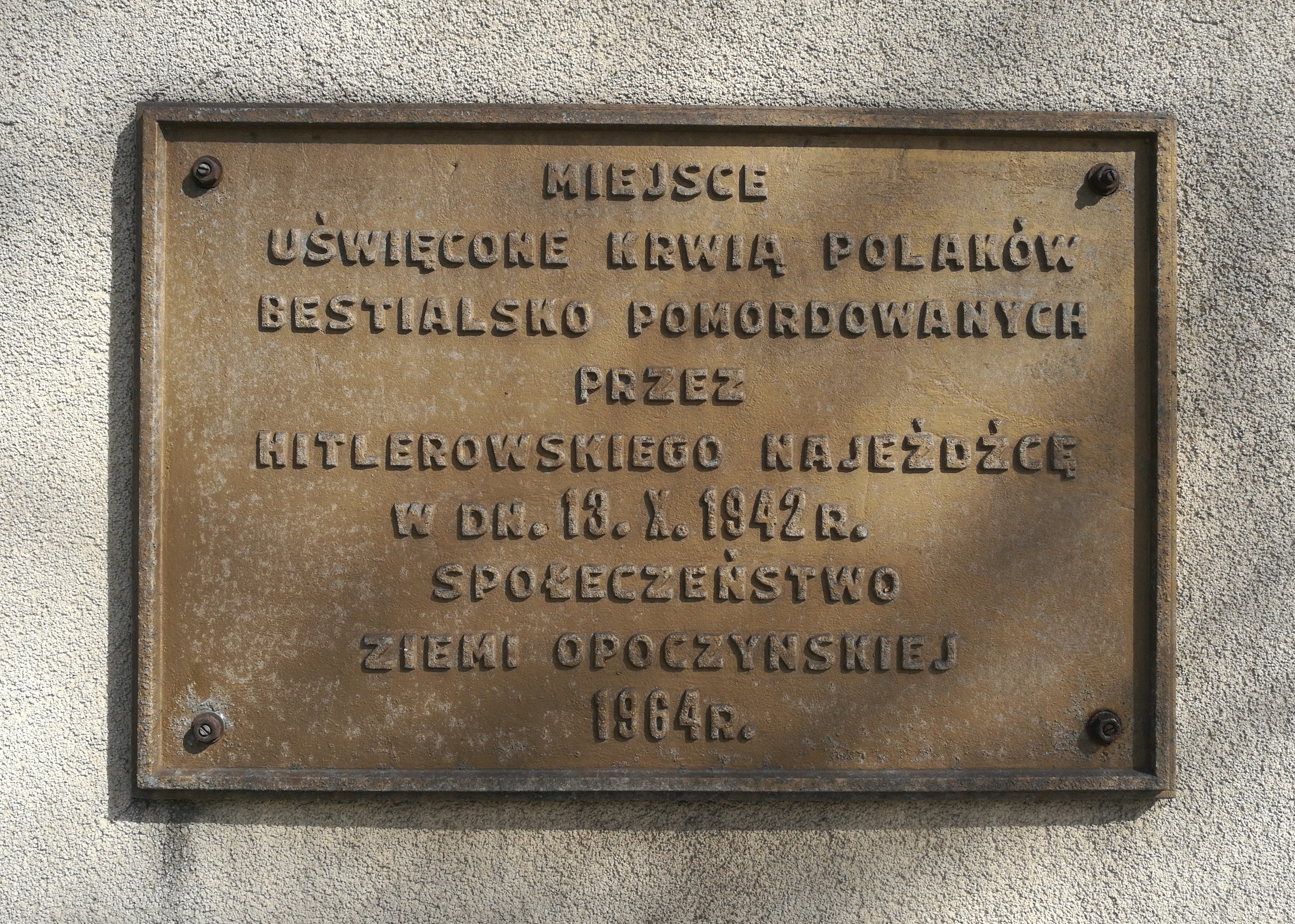
Memorial at the site of a German-perpetrated massacre of Poles from 1942

In the early stages of World War II, Opoczno was the site of fierce combat during the Invasion of Poland. The Wehrmacht entered the town on Thursday, September 7, 1939, at 2 p.m., after a heavy bombing by the Luftwaffe. The area of Opoczno was defended by Prusy Army, which concentrated between Piotrków Trybunalski and Tomaszów Mazowiecki. Wilhelm Fritz von Roettig, the first general to be killed in the war, was killed here just a few days after the war began, on September 10, on the road between Inowłódz and Opoczno. On September 11, 1939, the Germans killed the mayor of Opoczno Ignacy Zakrzewski.

Opoczno was one of main centers of anti-German resistance. The area of the town saw first underground activity as early as spring 1940, when Major Henryk Dobrzański's partisan "Separated Unit of the Polish Army" operated there. The Home Army district of Opoczno had more than 2,000 soldiers (as for December 1, 1944). In 1940, a Jewish ghetto was opened, which housed several thousand people, forcibly transferred here from other locations. The ghetto was liquidated in January 1943, when its residents were transported to Treblinka extermination camp. German occupation ended on January 17, 1945, when the Wehrmacht was pushed out by the Red Army, with 150 Soviet soldiers killed during the fighting in the town.

Two weeks later, first high school in the history of Opoczno was opened. Until 1975, Opoczno belonged to Kielce Voivodeship, and afterwards it was part of the Piotrków Voivodeship until 1998. In 1958–1964, a new hospital was built, and in September 1960, the town celebrated its 600th anniversary.

== Sights ==
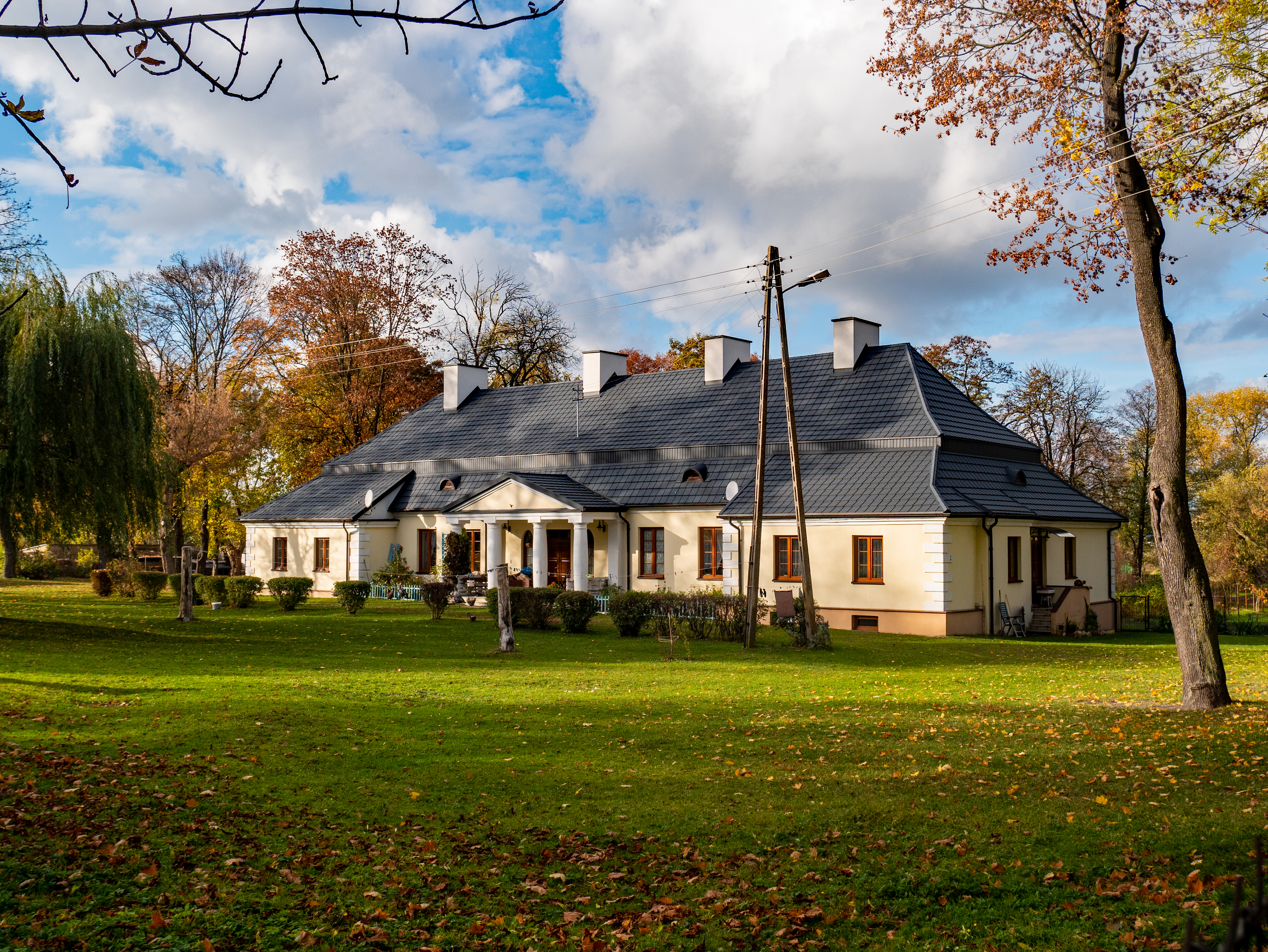
Former starost manor

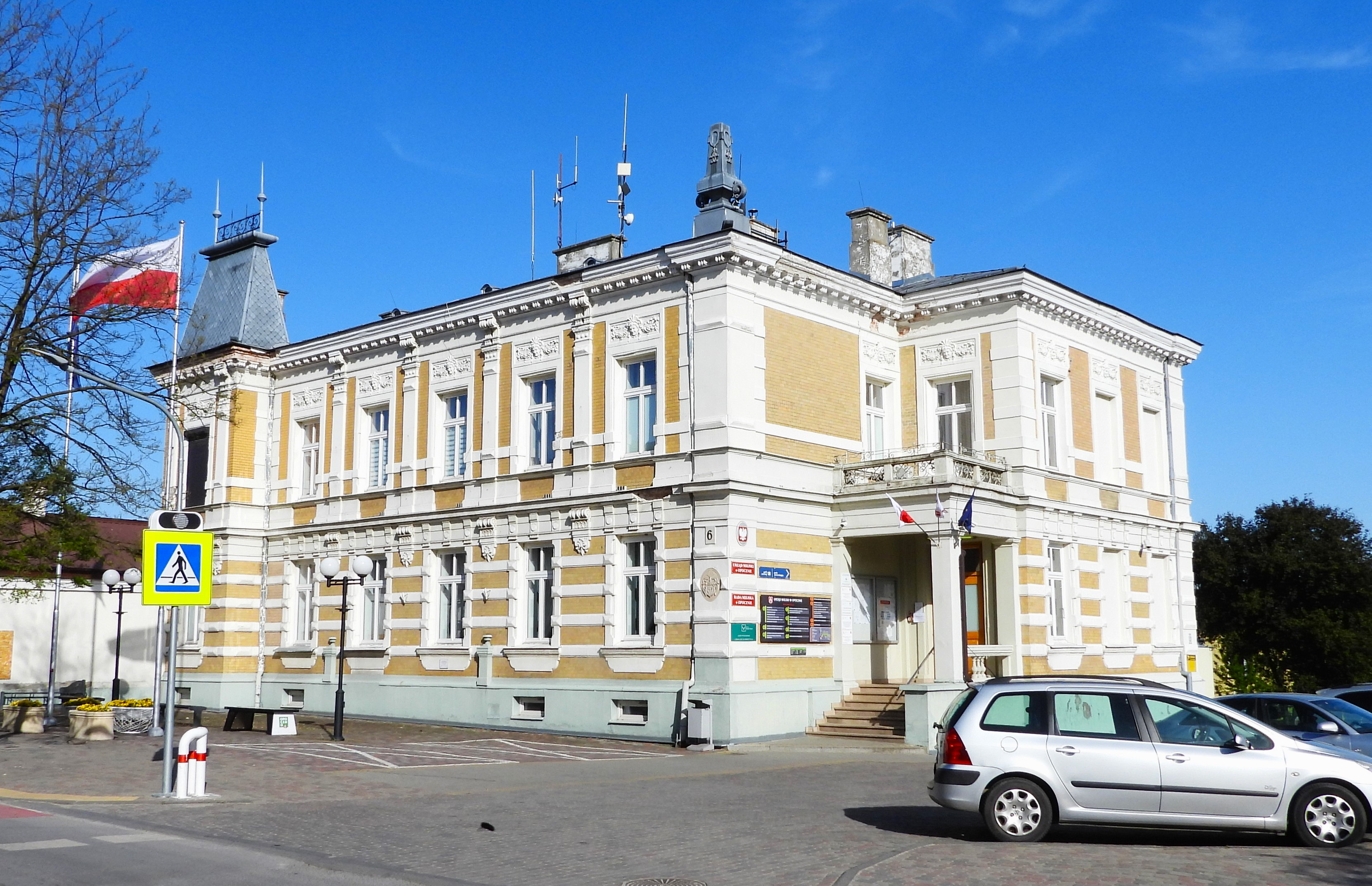
Town Hall

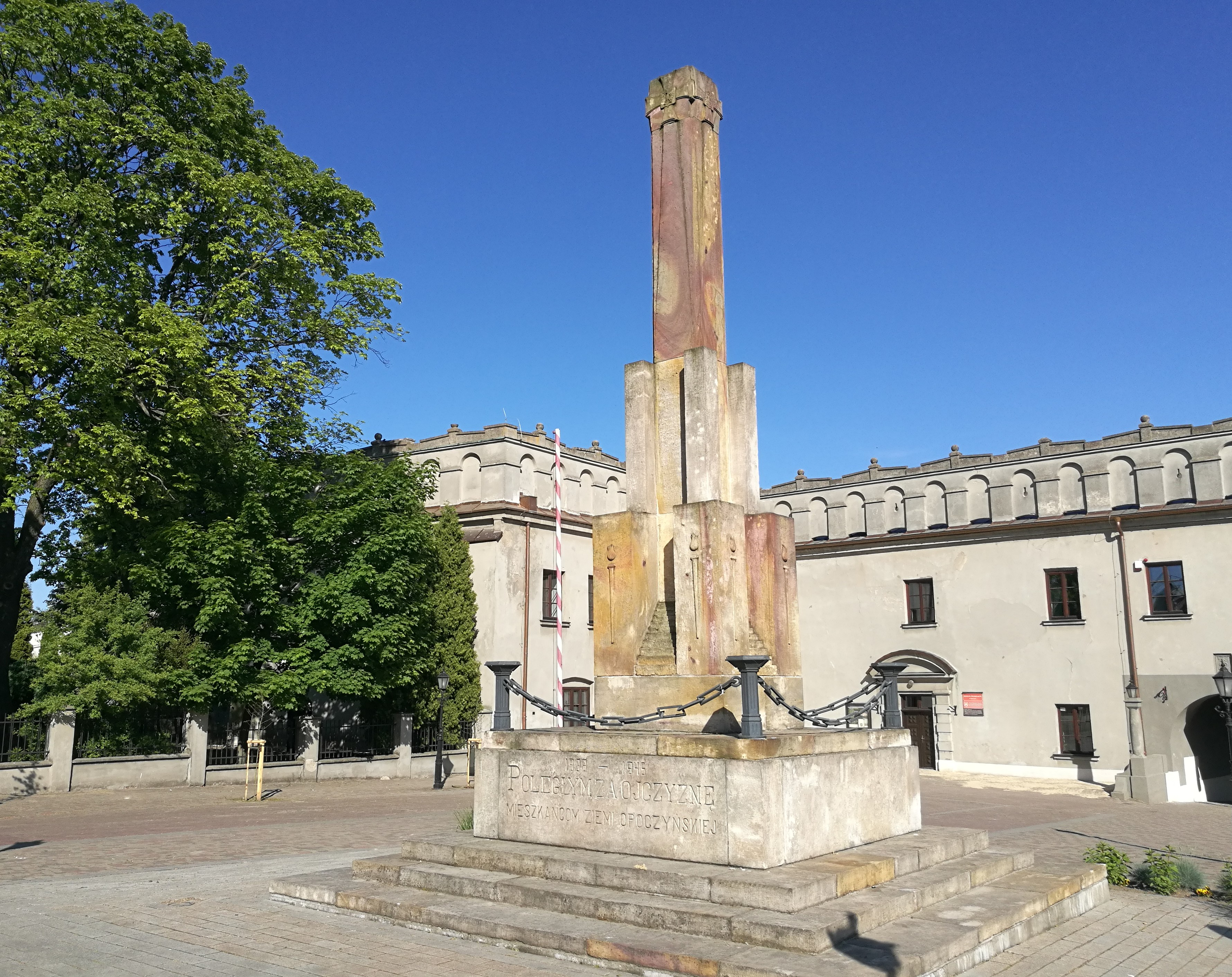
Monument to the Unknown Soldier

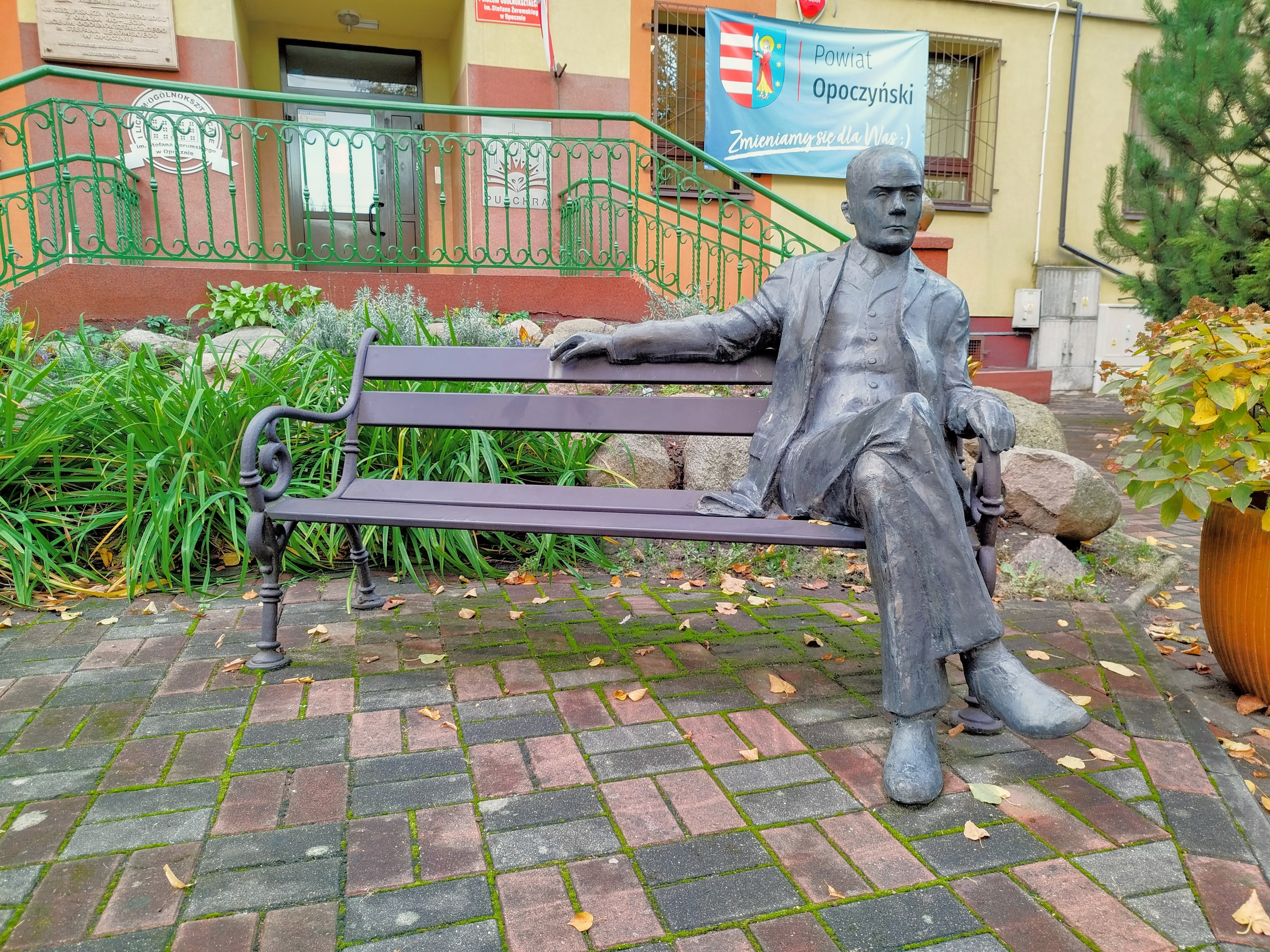
Stefan Żeromski Bench

Among most interesting points of interest in the town is the Opoczno Castle. Its origins date from the mid-14th century, when King Casimir III the Great initiated construction of a number of castles across Poland. Opoczno Castle was located within town walls, and was the seat of a starosta. It burned down in the great fire in the 15th century, and its current shape is the result of the reconstruction of the original complex. Later on, another starost residence was built in form of a typical manor house of Polish nobility. Another interesting object is the House of Esterka. According to legend, Esterka was a Jewish mistress of Casimir the Great, was the daughter of a tailor from Opoczno, and the house in which she allegedly was raised is located in Opoczno's market square. The house was reconstructed in 1893, and it still preserves original, 16th-century Latin inscriptions, together with coat of arms of Sandomierz Voivodeship, to which Opoczno belonged for centuries. The house currently serves as a library.

There are also several World War II memorials, including memorials to the victims of German-perpetrated executions and the Holocaust, victims of German prisons and concentration camps, victims of the Soviet-perpetrated Katyn massacre, and to the local Polish resistance. The Holocaust victims memorial was unveiled on October 25, 2012. The monument bears the inscription carved in stone: "In memory of the Jewish inhabitants of the Opoczno county, who were gathered on this square on october 27, 1942, and sent by the Germans to the death camp in Treblinka" and is signed "On the 70th anniversary of these events, the city and people of the city and county of Opoczno." On November 16, 2012, the plaque became target of night-time vandalism; it was lifted with a crow bar, overturned, and shattered. The shocked community rebuilt it in no time with additional stone base, and the second ceremonial unveiling took place on December 18, 2012 in the presence of Opoczno mayor, as well as numerous state dignitaries and parliamentarians, Catholic priests, and the Chief Rabi of Poland, Michael Schudrich.

== Sports ==
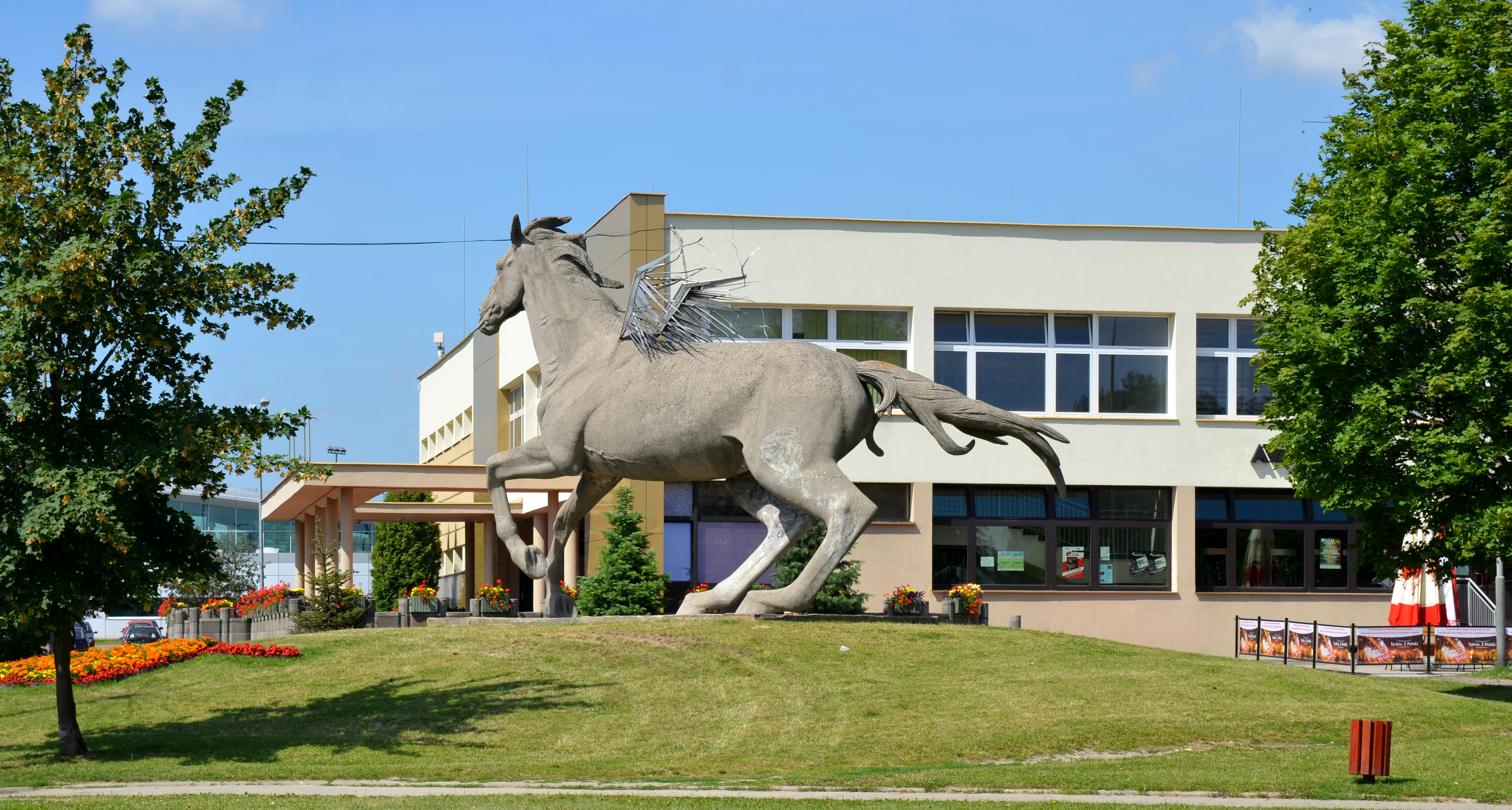
Opoczno Cultural Centre, with Pegasus sculpture

Opoczno is home to People’s Sports Club (Ludowy Klub Sportowy) Ceramika Opoczno, which was established in 1945 as OMTUR, and which in the past bore several names. For eight seasons (1996–2004), Ceramika played in Polish Second Division.

== Notable residents ==
- Edmund Biernacki (1866–1911), physician
- Grzegorz Bociek (born 1991), volleyball player
- Adam Kszczot (born 1989), middle-distance runner
- Wlodzimierz Perzynski (1877–1930), writer and dramatist
- Grzegorz Piechna (born 1976), footballer
- Patryk Dominik Sztyber (born 1979), heavy metal musician
- Żabson (born 1994), rapper and songwriter
- Piotr Stępień (born 2001), boxer and kickboxer

== Twin towns ==
Opoczno is twinned with:

- Opočno, Czech Republic
- Jarocin, Poland
- Bytča, Slovakia
- Sloviansk, Ukraine
- Zviahel, Ukraine
- Hegyvidék, Hungary
