= Końskie massacre =

1939 massacre of Jewish civilians by German soldiers in occupied Poland

- Part of the invasion of Poland and German war crimes during the invasion of Poland
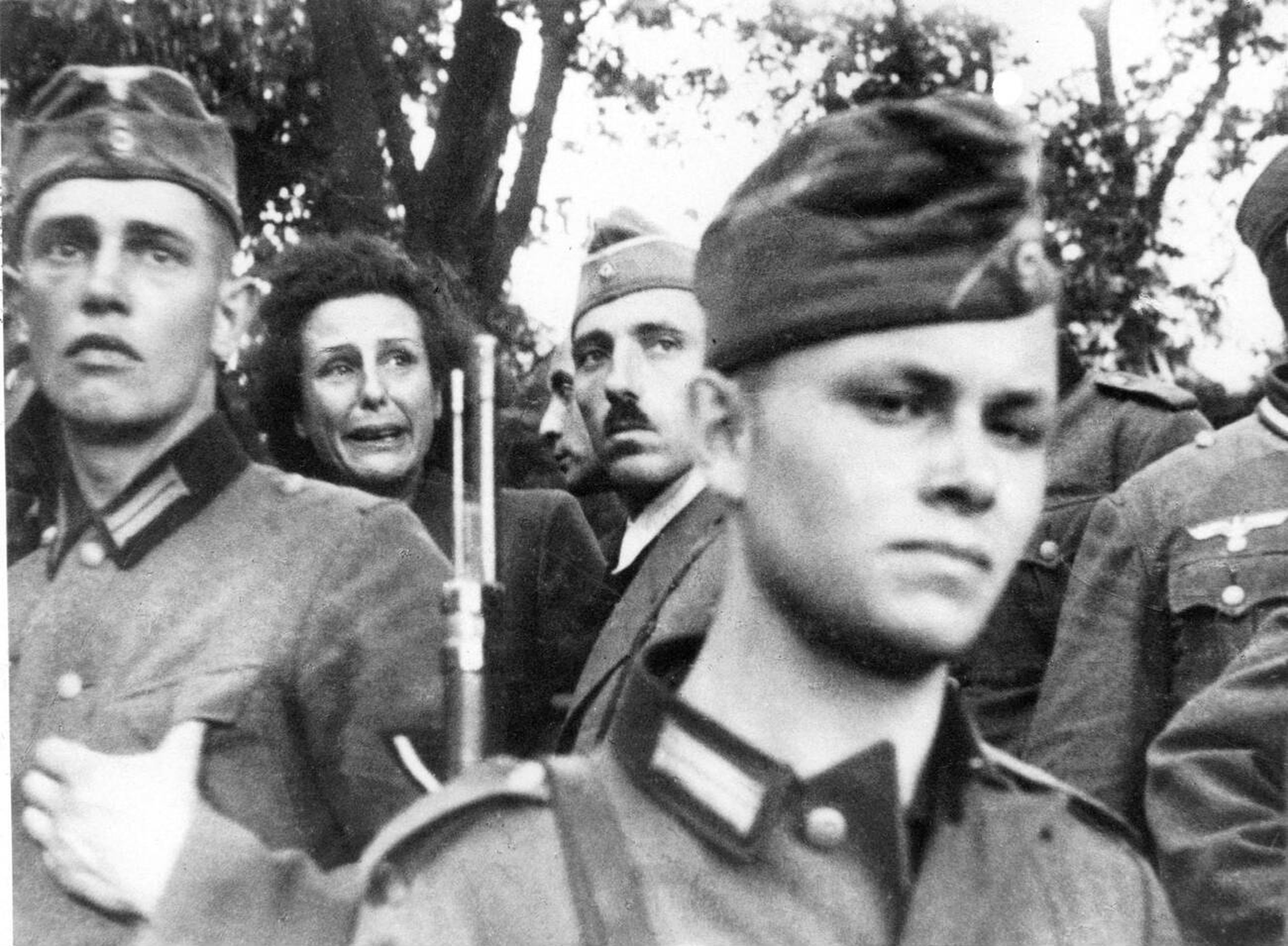
- Leni Riefenstahl in Końskie during the shooting of Jewish civilians, 12 September 1939
- Location: Końskie, German-occupied Poland
- Date: 12 September 1939
- Target: Jewish civilians
- Attack type: Mass shooting, war crime
- Deaths: 19–22 Jewish civilians
- Injuries: At least 8
- Perpetrator: German soldiers
- Motive: Anti-Jewish violence during the German invasion of Poland; punitive violence connected to German dead

The Końskie massacre (Polish: Masakra w Końskich) was a German war crime committed against Jewish civilians in Końskie, Poland, on 12 September 1939, during the invasion of Poland. German soldiers forced local Jews to dig graves for dead German soldiers and then opened fire during a chaotic incident, killing approximately 19 to 22 Jewish civilians and wounding several others.

The massacre became internationally known because the German film director and Nazi propagandist Leni Riefenstahl was present in Końskie with a film unit. Photographs taken at the scene, including one showing Riefenstahl visibly distressed among German soldiers, later became part of the historical record of the incident.

== Background ==
Końskie was occupied by German forces during the opening weeks of the invasion of Poland. On 12 September 1939, German authorities held funeral ceremonies for four Wehrmacht soldiers killed earlier in the campaign. According to the Polish Institute of National Remembrance, Riefenstahl and members of her film crew were present at the funeral, and the Germans ordered local Jews to dig graves for the dead soldiers.

Anti-Jewish violence accompanied the German campaign in Poland from its first weeks. The Institute of National Remembrance describes German soldiers during the invasion as committing repeated war crimes against civilians and prisoners of war, and identifies antisemitism within the German army as one factor in humiliations and violence directed at Jewish communities.

== Massacre ==
Accounts of the massacre agree that Jewish civilians were compelled to perform grave-digging work for German dead. A local account published by Końskie.org.pl, drawing on Jan Garbacz's Dni września 1939 na Ziemi Koneckiej, states that about 50 Jews were rounded up for the work, that only some had tools, and that others had to dig with their hands while being beaten by German soldiers.

After the grave-digging was completed, the Jews were driven away or ordered to disperse. According to the same account, German soldiers continued beating and kicking them as they moved away, prompting some of the men to flee. A vehicle then arrived, driven by a Luftwaffe communications officer identified in Polish accounts as Kleimichel or Kleinmichel; he opened fire, and other German soldiers then joined the shooting.

The local account gives the result as 22 killed and 8 wounded. Polskie Radio, citing Jochen Böhler's work on Wehrmacht crimes in Poland, states that 19 Jews were killed at the scene, eight were wounded, and three of the wounded died in the following days, producing the commonly cited total of 22 dead.

== Casualty estimates ==
The number of victims is given differently in available sources. The Polish Institute of National Remembrance states that 22 Jews were killed during the shooting. German History in Documents and Images gives the figure as 19 Polish Jews killed and many others severely injured. The difference may reflect the distinction between those killed immediately and those who died later from wounds; Polskie Radio gives 19 killed at the scene and three later deaths among the wounded.

== Leni Riefenstahl's presence ==
Riefenstahl had gone to Poland as a war correspondent and filmmaker attached to German forces. German History in Documents and Images states that on 10 September 1939 she was at the Polish front at Hitler's request, filming material for a documentary about the German campaign, and that she travelled with a special film unit. The Polish Institute of National Remembrance states that she and members of her crew were present in Końskie on 12 September during the funeral of four Wehrmacht soldiers and that members of the film crew witnessed the shooting.

The incident became closely associated with Riefenstahl because photographs later placed her at the scene. German History in Documents and Images states that her postwar denial of knowledge of the crime was contradicted by a photograph inscribed that she fainted after seeing dead Jews. The Polish Institute of National Remembrance identifies a photograph of Riefenstahl being supported by German soldiers during the shooting of unarmed people in Końskie.

In 2024, new attention was drawn to Riefenstahl's possible role in the incident after the documentary Riefenstahl, directed by Andres Veiel, reported a 1952 letter from her estate. According to reporting by The Guardian, the letter claimed that Riefenstahl had wanted "the Jews" removed from an area where she intended to film, and that a soldier's relaying of this request as "get rid of the Jews" may have contributed to the shooting when some Jews attempted to flee. The Times of Israel also reported the documentary's claim, while presenting it as an argument made by the film rather than an established judicial finding.

== Responsibility and aftermath ==
Polskie Radio identifies the officer who began the shooting as Brunon Kleinmichel and states that he was later tried by a Wehrmacht court of the 10th Army, not for murder but for breach of discipline, receiving a one-year prison sentence. The same account states that the other soldiers who fired on the Jews were not held responsible.

The Końskie massacre was separate from the later destruction of the Jewish community of Końskie. During the occupation, the Germans established a ghetto in the town. Virtual Shtetl states that the ghetto was liquidated in November 1942 and that its inhabitants were transported mainly to the Treblinka extermination camp, with a small number of survivors later moved to the Szydłowiec ghetto in January 1943. Yad Vashem similarly states that in November 1942 the Końskie ghetto was liquidated and the Jews living there were deported to Treblinka.

== See also ==
- German war crimes during the invasion of Poland
- The Holocaust in Poland
- War crimes of the Wehrmacht
- Leni Riefenstahl
- Treblinka extermination camp
