= Zabiele =

Zabiele may refer to the following places in Poland:

- Zabiele, Lower Silesian Voivodeship (south-west Poland)
- Zabiele, Gmina Kolno in Podlaskie Voivodeship (north-east Poland)
- Zabiele, Gmina Stawiski in Podlaskie Voivodeship (north-east Poland)
- Zabiele, Mońki County in Podlaskie Voivodeship (north-east Poland)
- Zabiele, Lubartów County in Lublin Voivodeship (east Poland)
- Zabiele, Wysokie Mazowieckie County in Podlaskie Voivodeship (north-east Poland)
- Zabiele, Łuków County in Lublin Voivodeship (east Poland)
- Zabiele, Radzyń County in Lublin Voivodeship (east Poland)
- Zabiele, Mława County in Masovian Voivodeship (east-central Poland)
- Zabiele, Ostrołęka County in Masovian Voivodeship (east-central Poland)
- Zabiele, Warmian-Masurian Voivodeship (north Poland)
