= Jan Hempel (philosopher) =

Polish anarchist

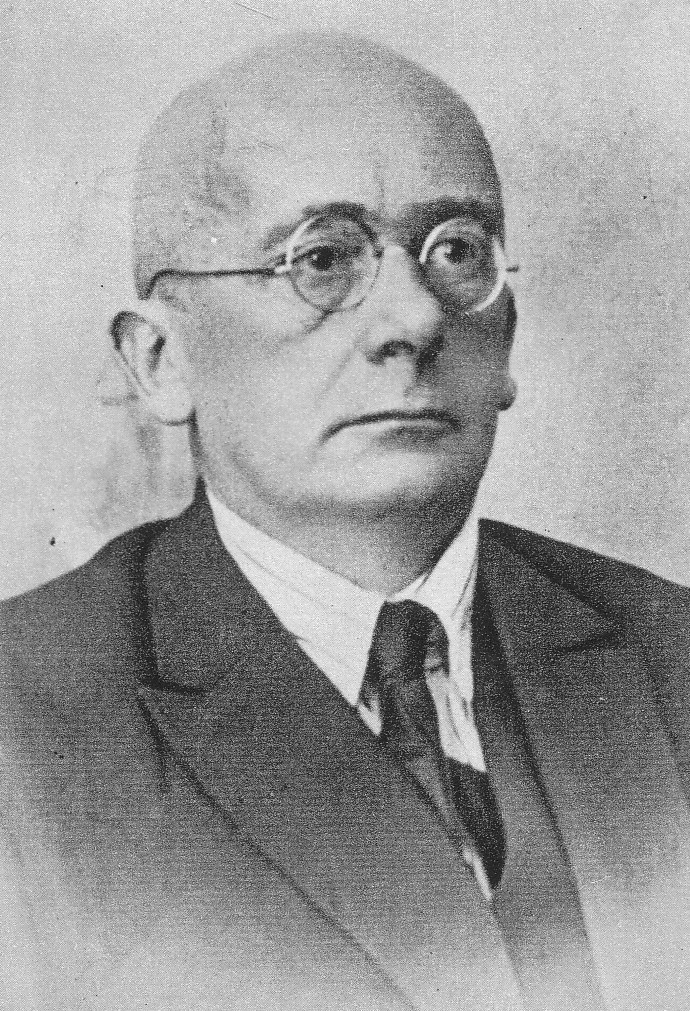
- Born: Jan Hieronim Hempel; 3 May 1877; Stara Prawda, Lublin Governorate, Vistula Land
- Died: 2 September 1937 (aged 60); Moscow, Russian SFSR, Soviet Union
- Cause of death: Execution
- Burial place: Donskoye Cemetery
- Other name: Jan Wiślak
- Occupation: Geometer
- Organization: PAF
- Political party: PPS
- Other political affiliations: PPS–L; KPP

Jan Hempel (1877-1937) was a Polish geometer, advocate for the cooperative movement, and philosopher who mixed elements of anarchism and nationalism in his writings. He was the translator of works by William James, Karl Kautsky, and Peter Kropotkin.

== Biography ==
Hempel was born in Stara Prawda on 3 May 1877 to Helena (née Krzyżanowska) and Józef Hempel. After leaving primary education, he enrolled at a technical school to train as a locksmith. In 1903 he left Poland travelling across South and East Asia whilst work in various jobs including on the Chinese Eastern Railway, and eventually as a teacher in the Polish community in Paraná, Brazil. Whilst in South America Hempel published his first major work Kazania polskie. By 1908 he had returned to Europe, residing in France where he encountered anarcho-syndacalist ideas and published Kazania piastowe. Before the outbreak of WWI, Hempel had returned to Poland, where he became engaged in the cooperative and educational movements. A notable student of his in this period was the future Polish President Bolesław Bierut. Hempel's activities soon brought him unwanted attention from the authorities, and he was forced to flee to the Kingdom of Galicia and Lodomeria where he enlisted in the Polish Legions before being arrested for refusing to swear an oath of allegiance to the Emperor. Following the end of WWI, Hempel became active in the Communist Party of Poland and became a political exile as a result.

=== Death ===
In 1937 Hempel was arrested in the Soviet Union and subsequently executed on 2 September.

== Philosophy ==
Hempel's philosophical thought was influenced by the messianism of Polish Romanticism. His writing particularly drew on the work of the Romantic Adam Mickiewicz, most obviously expressed through his reinterpretation of the latter's concept of the Christ of Nations, from his work Dziady. In contrast, Hempel described Poland as the Antichrist of Nations, partitioned precisely through its adherence to Christ. Poland could thus only regain its freedom by rejecting Christianity. Hempel referenced other Romantic writers, including Zygmunt Krasiński and Juliusz Słowacki, as well as his contemporary Tadeusz Miciński. Elsewhere in his work, he incorporated the ideas of Piotr Skarga and Friedrich Nietzsche. Anarchism was influential in his critique of ethics.
