= Łosiniec =

Łosiniec may refer to the following places in Poland:

- Łosiniec, Łuków County in Lublin Voivodeship (east Poland)
- Łosiniec, Gmina Susiec, Tomaszów County in Lublin Voivodeship (east Poland)
- Łosiniec, Podlaskie Voivodeship (north-east Poland)
- Łosiniec, Greater Poland Voivodeship (west-central Poland)
- Łosiniec, West Pomeranian Voivodeship (north-west Poland)
