= Jagodne =

Jagodne may refer to the following places:

- Jagodne, Chełm County in Lublin Voivodeship (east Poland)
- Jagodne, Łuków County in Lublin Voivodeship (east Poland)
- Jagodne, Ryki County in Lublin Voivodeship (east Poland)
- Jagodne, Świętokrzyskie Voivodeship (south-central Poland)
- Jagodne, Garwolin County in Masovian Voivodeship (east-central Poland)
- Jagodne, Siedlce County in Masovian Voivodeship (east-central Poland)
- Jagodne, Warmian-Masurian Voivodeship (north Poland)
- Jagodne, (also known as Bredūnai), Nesterov in Kaliningrad Oblast (Lithuania Minor)
