= Szyszki =

Szyszki may refer to the following places:

- Szyszki, Lublin Voivodeship (east Poland)
- Szyszki, Masovian Voivodeship (east-central Poland)
- Szyszki, Podlaskie Voivodeship (north-east Poland)
- Szyszki, Silesian Voivodeship (south Poland)
