= Kapice =

Kapice may refer to the following places:

- Kapice, Lublin Voivodeship (east Poland)
- Kapice, Podlaskie Voivodeship (north-east Poland)
- Kapice, West Pomeranian Voivodeship (north-west Poland)

or:

- Kapice, old name for Prilipac (south-west Serbia)
