= Plewki, Podlaskie Voivodeship =

Plewki
- Village
- Location within Poland
- Coordinates: 52°52′52″N 22°30′22″E
- Country: Poland
- Voivodeship: Podlaskie
- County: Wysokie Mazowieckie
- Gmina: Szepietowo
- Population: 70

Plewki [ˈplɛfki] is a village in the administrative district of Gmina Szepietowo, within Wysokie Mazowieckie County, Podlaskie Voivodeship, in north-eastern Poland.
