= Gmina Stoczek Łukowski =

Gmina Stoczek Łukowski Stoczek Łukowski Commune
- Gmina
- Coat of arms
- Interactive map of Gmina Stoczek Łukowski
- Coordinates (Stoczek Łukowski): 51°58′N 21°58′E
- Country: Poland
- Voivodeship: Lublin
- County: Łuków
- Seat: Stoczek Łukowski

Area
  - Total: 173.46 km^{2} (66.97 sq mi)

Population (2006)
  - Total: 8,566
  - Density: 49.38/km^{2} (127.9/sq mi)
- Website: www.stoczeklukowski.pl

Gmina Stoczek Łukowski is a rural gmina (administrative district) in Łuków County, Lublin Voivodeship, in eastern Poland. Its seat is the town of Stoczek Łukowski, although the town is not part of the territory of the gmina.

The gmina covers an area of 173.46 square kilometres (67.0 sq mi), and as of 2006 its total population is 8,566.

== Villages ==
Gmina Stoczek Łukowski contains the villages and settlements of Aleksandrówka, Błażejki, Borki, Celej, Guzówka, Jagodne, Jamielne, Jamielnik-Kolonia, Januszówka, Jedlanka, Kamionka, Kapice, Kienkówka, Kisielsk, Łosiniec, Mizary, Nowa Prawda, Nowe Kobiałki, Nowy Jamielnik, Rosy, Róża Podgórna, Ruda, Stara Prawda, Stara Róża, Stare Kobiałki, Stary Jamielnik, Szyszki, Toczyska, Turzec, Wiśniówka, Wola Kisielska, Wólka Poznańska, Wólka Różańska, Zabiele and Zgórznica.

== Neighbouring gminas ==
Gmina Stoczek Łukowski is bordered by the town of Stoczek Łukowski and by the gminas of Borowie, Domanice, Łuków, Miastków Kościelny, Stanin, Wodynie and Wola Mysłowska.
