= Moczydły-Jakubowięta =

- Village
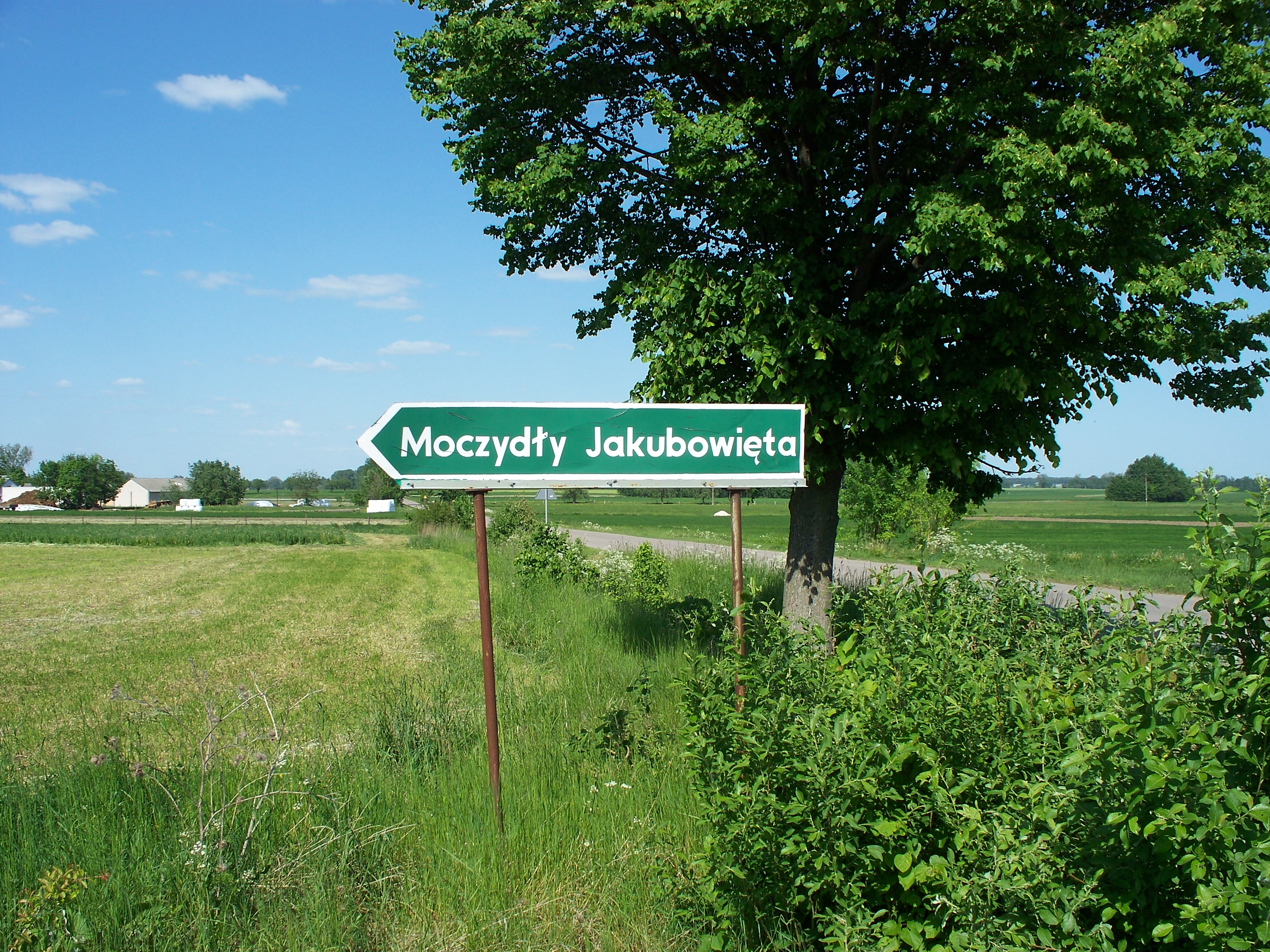
- Road sign in Moczydły Jakubowięta

- Location within Poland
- Coordinates: 52°53′23″N 22°37′57″E
- Country: Poland
- Voivodeship: Podlaskie
- County: Wysokie Mazowieckie
- Gmina: Szepietowo

Moczydły-Jakubowięta [mɔˈt͡ʂɨdwɨ jakubɔˈvjɛnta] is a village in the administrative district of Gmina Szepietowo, within Wysokie Mazowieckie County, Podlaskie Voivodeship, in north-eastern Poland.
