= Dąbrowa-Bybytki =

- Village
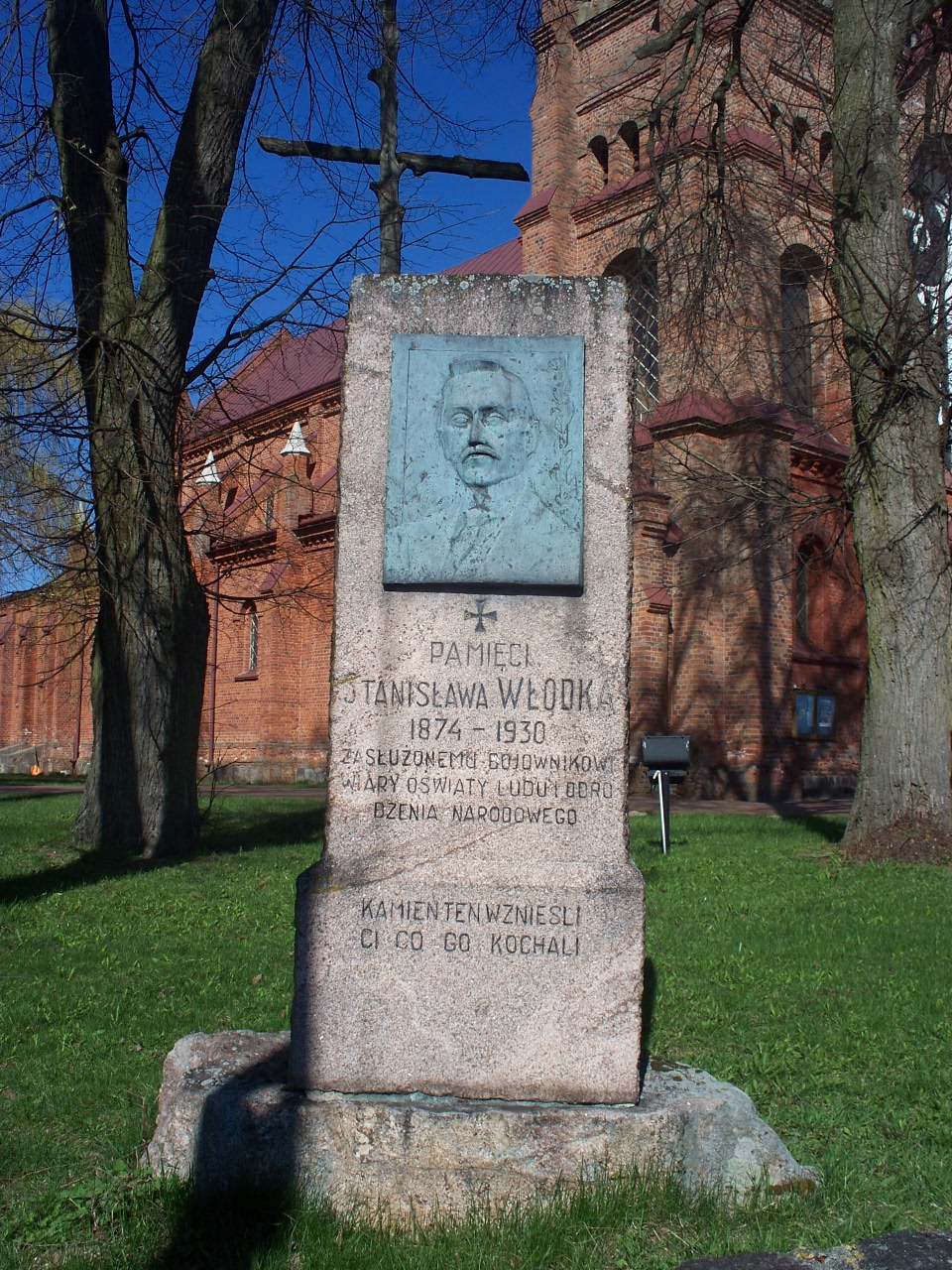
- Monument in Dąbrowa-Bybytki

- Location within Poland
- Coordinates: 52°49′51″N 22°28′15″E
- Country: Poland
- Voivodeship: Podlaskie
- County: Wysokie Mazowieckie
- Gmina: Szepietowo
- Time zone: UTC+1 (CET)
  - Summer (DST): UTC+2 (CEST)
- Postal code: 18-210
- Vehicle registration: BWM

Dąbrowa-Bybytki [dɔmˈbrɔva bɨˈbɨtki] is a village in the administrative district of Gmina Szepietowo, within Wysokie Mazowieckie County, Podlaskie Voivodeship, in north-eastern Poland.

== History ==
Four Polish citizens were murdered by Nazi Germany in the village during World War II.
