= Szepietowo-Żaki =

- Village
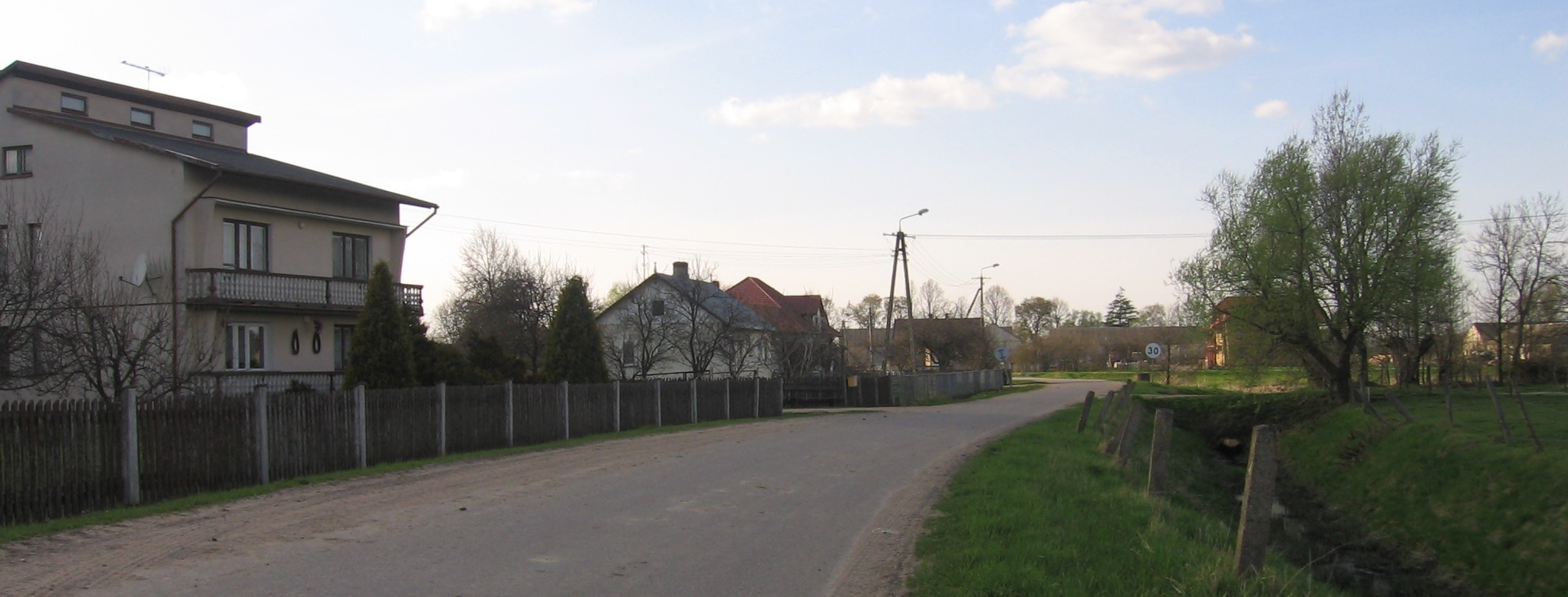
- Street of Szepietowo-Żaki

- Location within Poland
- Coordinates: 52°51′10″N 22°29′55″E
- Country: Poland
- Voivodeship: Podlaskie
- County: Wysokie Mazowieckie
- Gmina: Szepietowo

Szepietowo-Żaki [ʂɛpjɛˈtɔvɔ ˈʐaki] is a village in the administrative district of Gmina Szepietowo, within Wysokie Mazowieckie County, Podlaskie Voivodeship, in north-eastern Poland.
