= Wólka Różańska =

- Village
- Location within Poland
- Coordinates: 51°58′N 22°2′E
- Country: Poland
- Voivodeship: Lublin
- County: Łuków
- Gmina: Stoczek Łukowski

Wólka Różańska [ˈvulka ruˈʐaɲska] is a village in the administrative district of Gmina Stoczek Łukowski, within Łuków County, Lublin Voivodeship, in eastern Poland.
