= Średnica-Maćkowięta =

- Village
- Location within Poland
- Coordinates: 52°52′40″N 22°34′10″E
- Country: Poland
- Voivodeship: Podlaskie
- County: Wysokie Mazowieckie
- Gmina: Szepietowo

Średnica-Maćkowięta [ɕrɛdˈnit͡sa mat͡ɕkɔˈvjɛnta] is a village in the administrative district of Gmina Szepietowo, within Wysokie Mazowieckie County, Podlaskie Voivodeship, in north-eastern Poland.

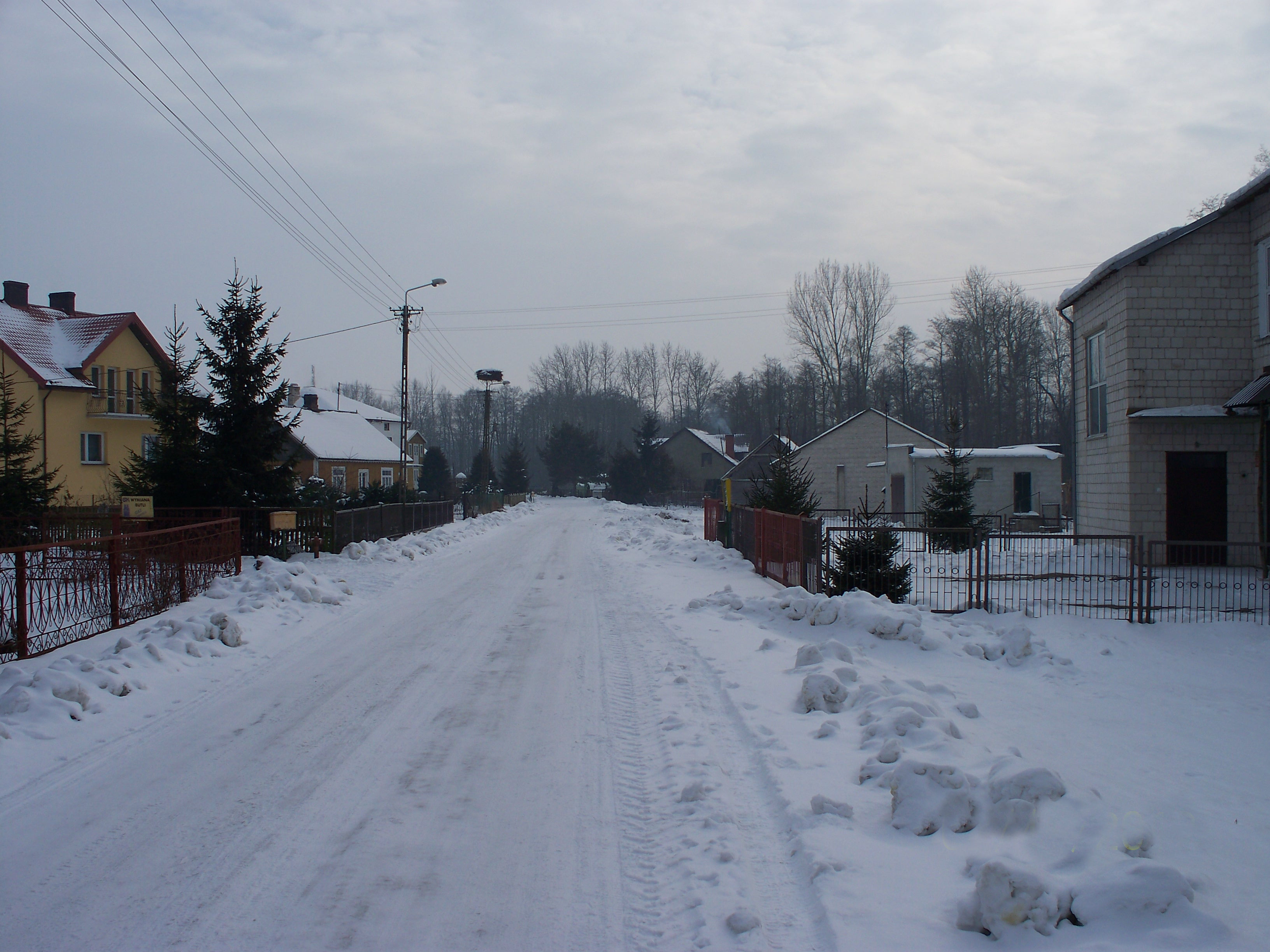
Średnica Maćkowięta
