= Wyliny-Ruś =

- Village
- Location within Poland
- Coordinates: 52°48′20″N 22°38′57″E
- Country: Poland
- Voivodeship: Podlaskie
- County: Wysokie Mazowieckie
- Gmina: Szepietowo
- Population: 120

Wyliny-Ruś [vɨˈlinɨ ˈruɕ] is a village in the administrative district of Gmina Szepietowo, within Wysokie Mazowieckie County, Podlaskie Voivodeship, in north-eastern Poland.
