= Gmina Szepietowo =

Gmina Szepietowo Szepietowo Commune
- Gmina
- Flag Coat of arms
- Interactive map of Gmina Szepietowo
- Coordinates (Szepietowo): 52°52′10″N 22°32′26″E
- Country: Poland
- Voivodeship: Podlaskie
- County: Wysokie Mazowieckie
- Seat: Szepietowo

Area
  - Total: 151.9 km^{2} (58.6 sq mi)

Population (2013)
  - Total: 7,213
  - Density: 47.49/km^{2} (123.0/sq mi)
  - Urban: 2,282
  - Rural: 4,931
- Website: http://www.szepietowo.pl

Gmina Szepietowo is an urban-rural gmina (administrative district) in Wysokie Mazowieckie County, Podlaskie Voivodeship, in north-eastern Poland. Its seat is the town of Szepietowo, which lies approximately 6 kilometres (4 mi) south of Wysokie Mazowieckie and 51 km (32 mi) south-west of the regional capital Białystok.

The gmina covers an area of 151.9 square kilometres (58.6 sq mi), and as of 2006 its total population is 7,485. (Before 1 January 2010, when Szepietowo became a town, the district was classed as a rural gmina.)

== Villages ==
Apart from the town of Szepietowo, the gmina contains the villages and settlements of Chorążyce, Dąbrowa-Bybytki, Dąbrowa-Dołęgi, Dąbrowa-Gogole, Dąbrowa-Kaski, Dąbrowa-Łazy, Dąbrowa-Moczydły, Dąbrowa-Tworki, Dąbrowa-Wilki, Dąbrowa-Zabłotne, Dąbrówka Kościelna, Jabłoń-Kikolskie, Jabłoń-Samsony, Kamień-Rupie, Moczydły-Jakubowięta, Moczydły-Stanisławowięta, Nowe Gierałty, Nowe Szepietowo Podleśne, Nowe Warele, Nowe Zalesie, Plewki, Pułazie-Świerże, Średnica-Jakubowięta, Średnica-Maćkowięta, Średnica-Pawłowięta, Stare Gierałty, Stary Kamień, Stawiereje Podleśne, Stawiereje-Michałowięta, Szepietowo Podleśne, Szepietowo-Janówka, Szepietowo-Wawrzyńce, Szepietowo-Żaki, Szymbory-Andrzejowięta, Szymbory-Jakubowięta, Szymbory-Włodki, Warele-Filipowicze, Włosty-Olszanka, Wojny-Izdebnik, Wojny-Krupy, Wojny-Piecki, Wojny-Pietrasze, Wojny-Pogorzel, Wojny-Szuby Szlacheckie, Wojny-Szuby Włościańskie, Wojny-Wawrzyńce, Wyliny-Ruś, Wyszonki-Posele and Zabiele.

== Neighbouring gminas ==
Gmina Szepietowo is bordered by the gminas of Brańsk, Czyżew-Osada, Klukowo, Nowe Piekuty and Wysokie Mazowieckie.
