= Warele-Filipowicze =

- Village
- Location within Poland
- Coordinates: 52°47′46″N 22°35′59″E
- Country: Poland
- Voivodeship: Podlaskie
- County: Wysokie Mazowieckie
- Gmina: Szepietowo

Warele-Filipowicze [vaˈrɛlɛ filipɔˈvit͡ʂɛ] is a village in the administrative district of Gmina Szepietowo, within Wysokie Mazowieckie County, Podlaskie Voivodeship, in north-eastern Poland.
