= Dąbrowa-Tworki =

- Village
- Location within Poland
- Coordinates: 52°48′48″N 22°28′45″E
- Country: Poland
- Voivodeship: Podlaskie
- County: Wysokie Mazowieckie
- Gmina: Szepietowo

Population (approx.)
  - Total: 30
- Postal code: 18-210
- Vehicle registration: BWM

Dąbrowa-Tworki [dɔmˈbrɔva ˈtfɔrki] is a village in the administrative district of Gmina Szepietowo, within Wysokie Mazowieckie County, Podlaskie Voivodeship, in north-eastern Poland.
