= Szymbory-Jakubowięta =

- Village
- Location within Poland
- Coordinates: 52°54′31″N 22°36′36″E
- Country: Poland
- Voivodeship: Podlaskie
- County: Wysokie Mazowieckie
- Gmina: Szepietowo

Szymbory-Jakubowięta (Polish pronunciation: [ʂɨmˈbɔrɨ jakubɔˈvjɛnta]) is a village in the administrative district of Gmina Szepietowo, within Wysokie Mazowieckie County, Podlaskie Voivodeship, in north-eastern Poland.
