= Nowe Szepietowo Podleśne =

- Village
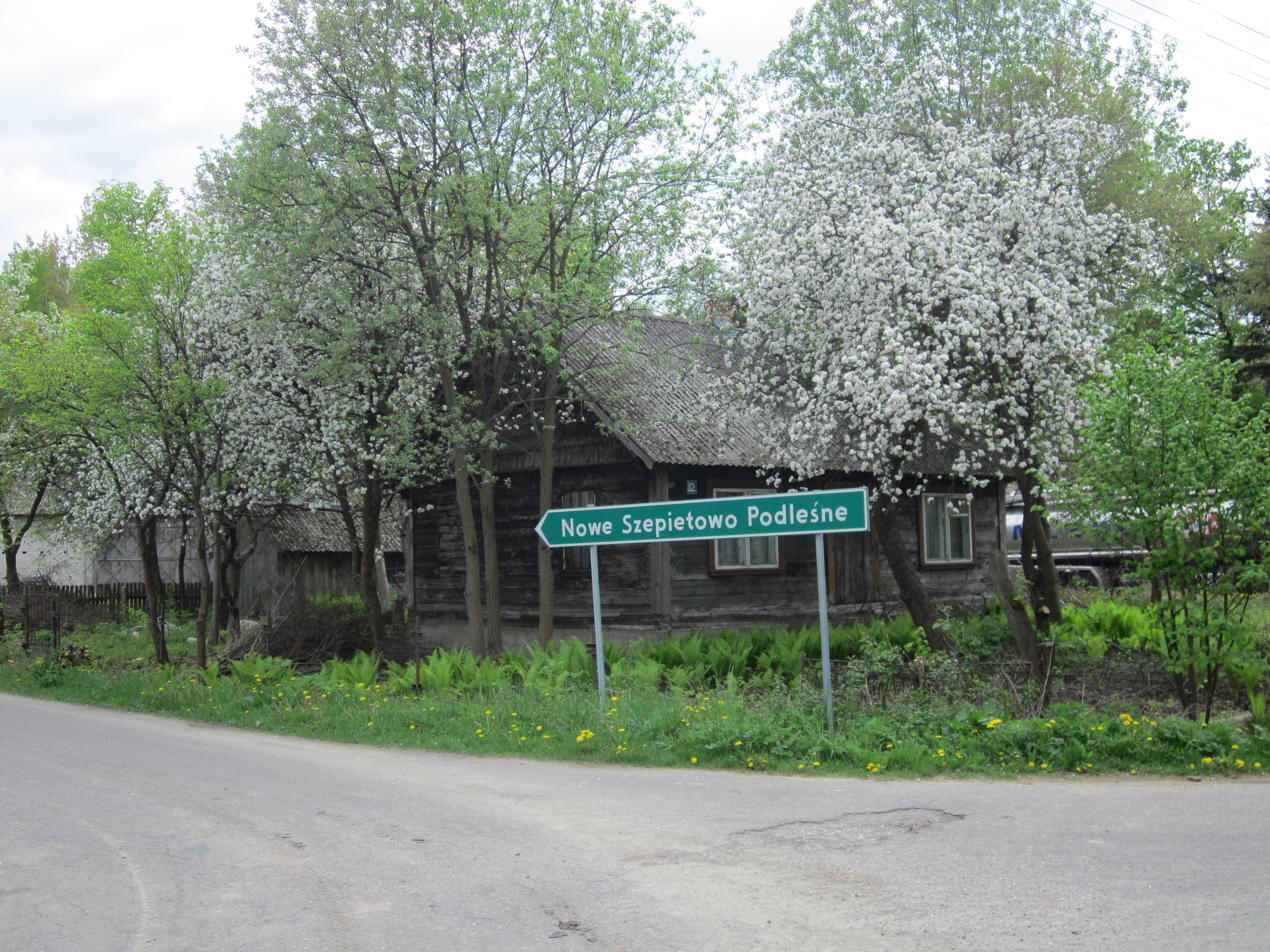

- Location within Poland
- Coordinates: 52°50′20″N 22°32′00″E
- Country: Poland
- Voivodeship: Podlaskie
- County: Wysokie Mazowieckie
- Gmina: Szepietowo

Nowe Szepietowo Podleśne [ˈnɔvɛ ʂɛpjɛˈtɔvɔ pɔdˈlɛɕnɛ] is a village in the administrative district of Gmina Szepietowo, within Wysokie Mazowieckie County, Podlaskie Voivodeship, in north-eastern Poland.
