= Włosty-Olszanka =

- Village
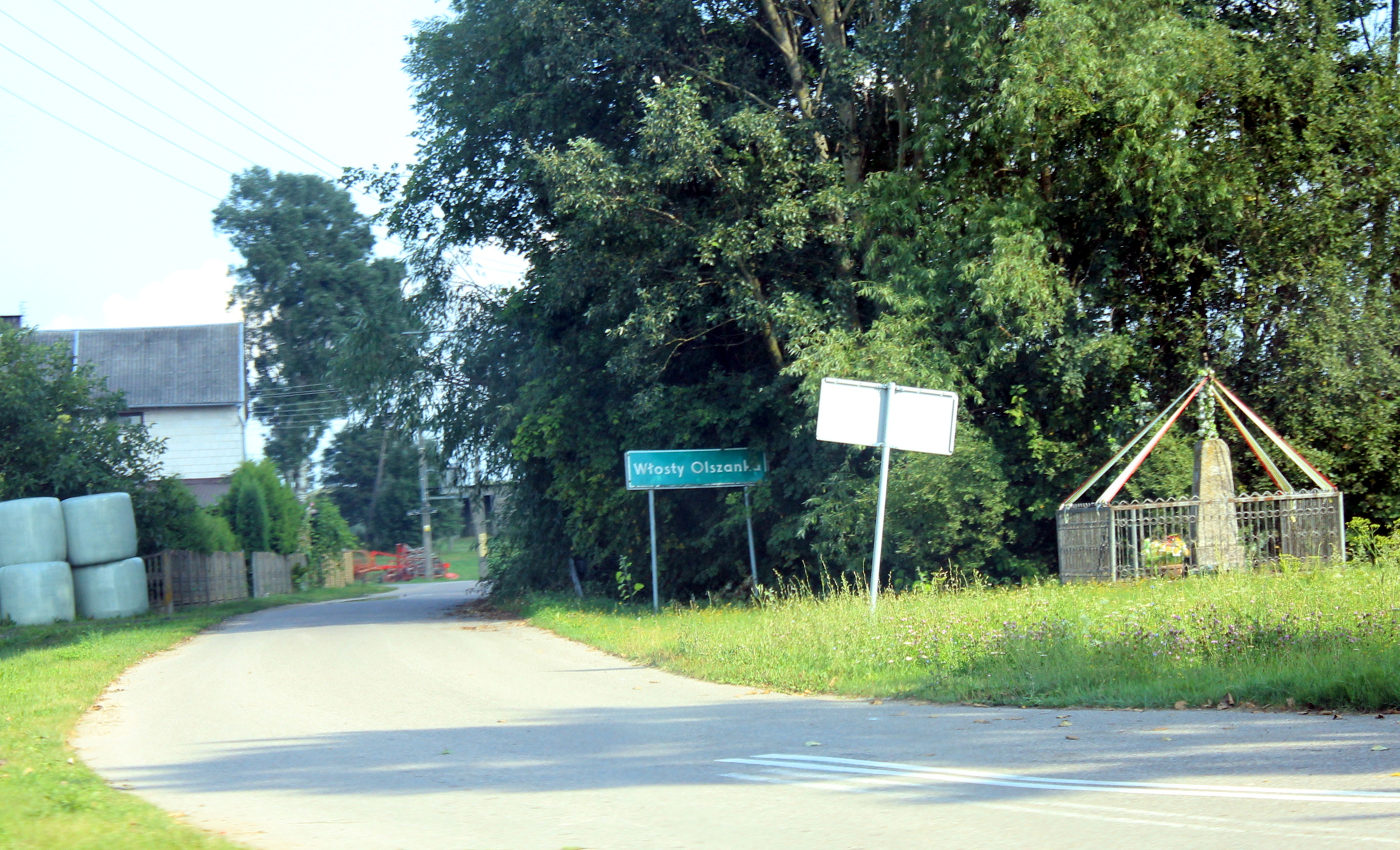

- Location within Poland
- Coordinates: 52°53′N 22°31′E
- Country: Poland
- Voivodeship: Podlaskie
- County: Wysokie Mazowieckie
- Gmina: Szepietowo
- Population: 140

Włosty-Olszanka [ˈvwɔstɨ ɔlˈʂaŋka] is a village in the administrative district of Gmina Szepietowo, within Wysokie Mazowieckie County, Podlaskie Voivodeship, in north-eastern Poland.
