= Szymbory-Włodki =

- Village
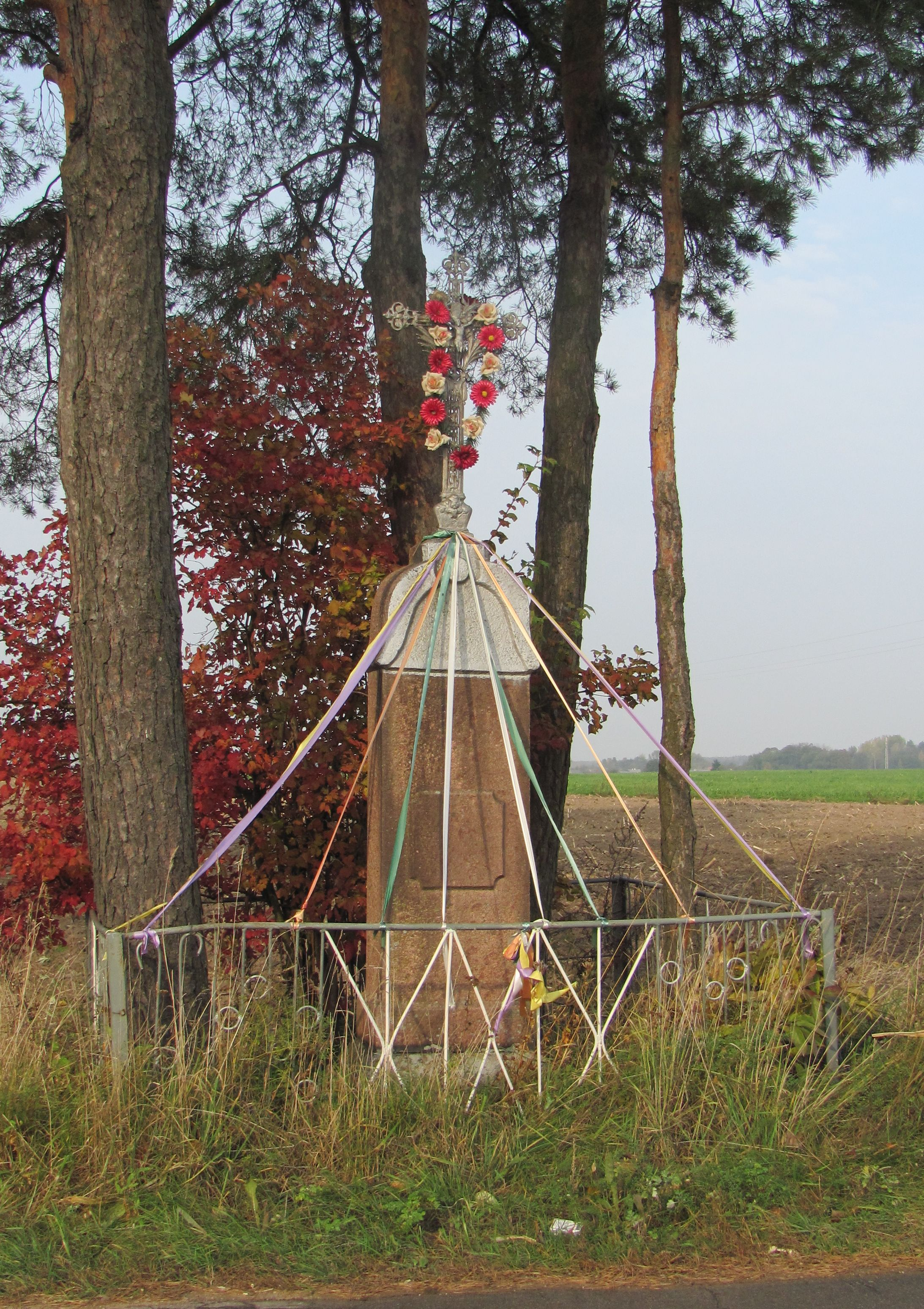
- Cross in Szymbory-Włodki

- Location within Poland
- Coordinates: 52°54′14″N 22°36′22″E
- Country: Poland
- Voivodeship: Podlaskie
- County: Wysokie Mazowieckie
- Gmina: Szepietowo

Szymbory-Włodki (Polish pronunciation: [ʂɨmˈbɔrɨ ˈvwɔtkʲi]) is a village in the administrative district of Gmina Szepietowo, within Wysokie Mazowieckie County, Podlaskie Voivodeship, in north-eastern Poland.
