= Jabłoń-Kikolskie =

- Village
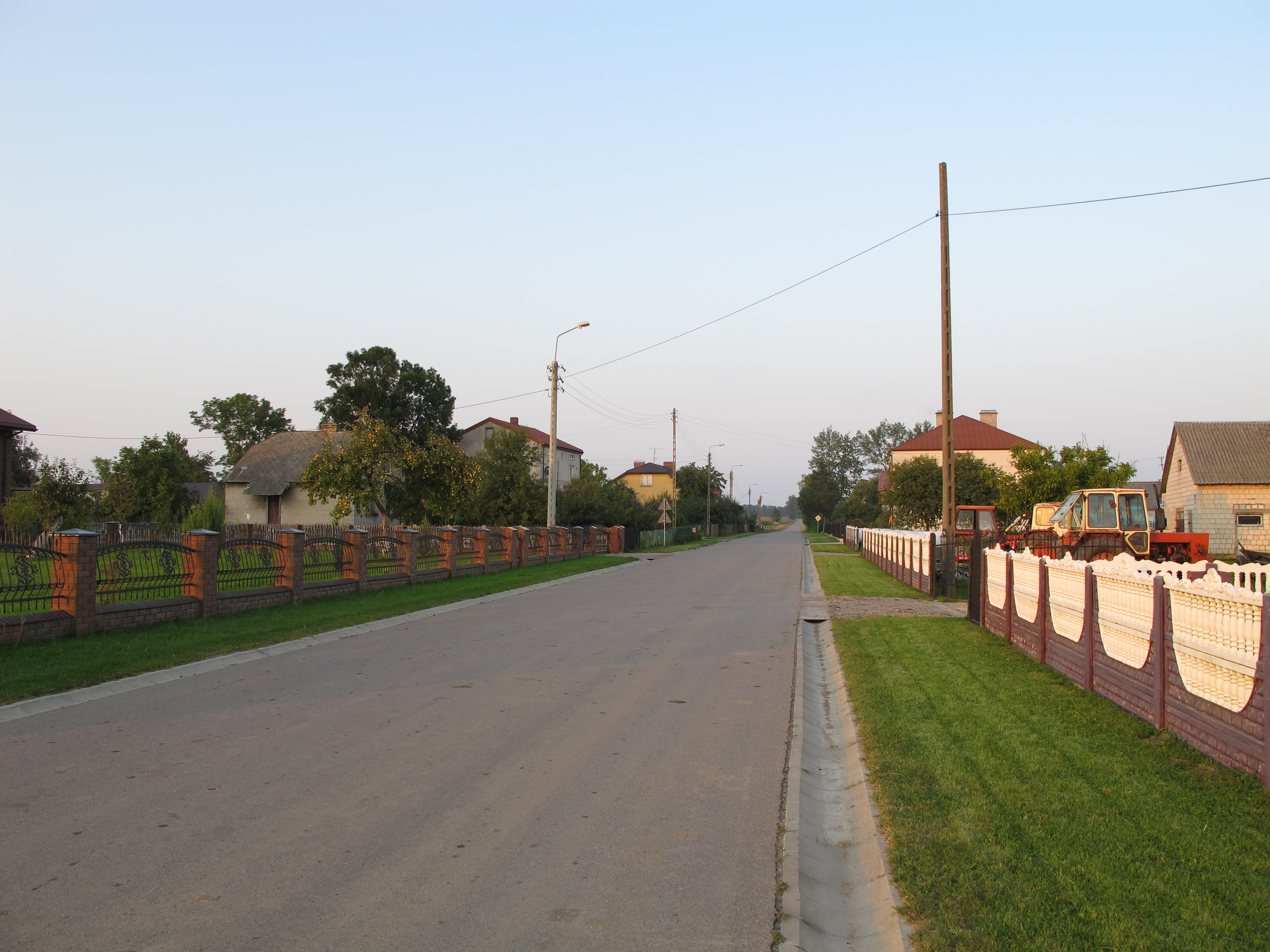

- Location within Poland
- Coordinates: 52°54′49″N 22°36′52″E
- Country: Poland
- Voivodeship: Podlaskie
- County: Wysokie Mazowieckie
- Gmina: Szepietowo
- Population: 48

Jabłoń-Kikolskie [ˈjabwɔɲ kiˈkɔlskʲɛ] is a village in the administrative district of Gmina Szepietowo, within Wysokie Mazowieckie County, Podlaskie Voivodeship, in north-eastern Poland.
