= Pułazie-Świerże =

- Village
- Location within Poland
- Coordinates: 52°50′29″N 22°36′43″E
- Country: Poland
- Voivodeship: Podlaskie
- County: Wysokie Mazowieckie
- Gmina: Szepietowo
- Time zone: UTC+1 (CET)
  - Summer (DST): UTC+2 (CEST)
- Postal code: 18-210
- Area code: +48 86

Pułazie-Świerże (Polish pronunciation: [puˈwaʑɛ ˈɕfjɛrʐɛ]) is a village in northeastern Poland, in the administrative district of Gmina Szepietowo, within Wysokie Mazowieckie County, Podlaskie Voivodeship, in the historic region of Podlachia.

The village is the originating seat of the Pułaski family, a Polish noble family whose most famous member was Kazimierz Pułaski.
