= Dąbrowa-Łazy =

- Village
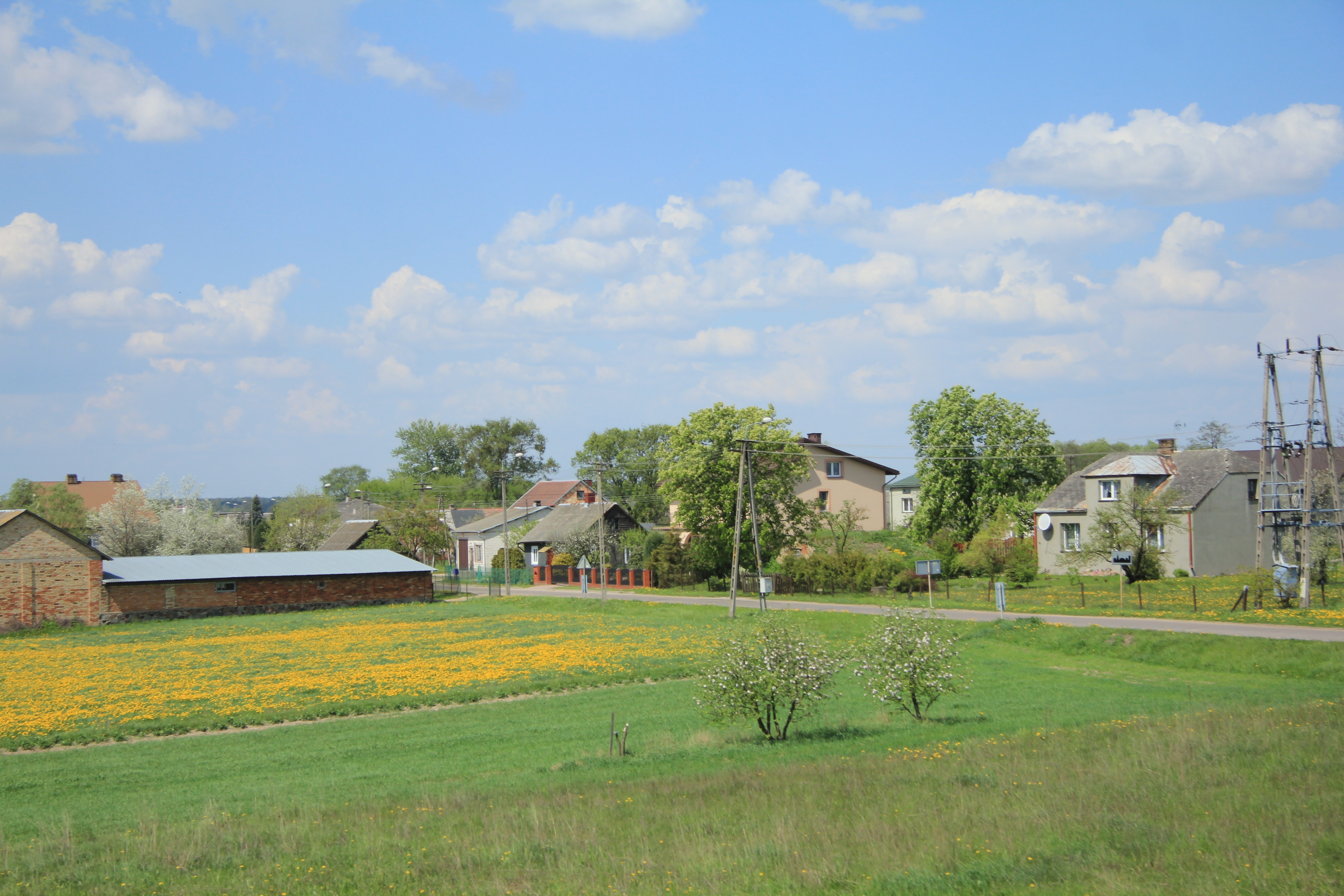

- Location within Poland
- Coordinates: 52°50′33″N 22°26′56″E
- Country: Poland
- Voivodeship: Podlaskie
- County: Wysokie Mazowieckie
- Gmina: Szepietowo
- Postal code: 18-210
- Vehicle registration: BWM

Dąbrowa-Łazy [dɔmˈbrɔva ˈwazɨ] is a village in the administrative district of Gmina Szepietowo, within Wysokie Mazowieckie County, Podlaskie Voivodeship, in north-eastern Poland.

Eight Polish citizens were murdered by Nazi Germany in the village during World War II.
