= Stary Jamielnik =

- Village
- Location within Poland
- Coordinates: 51°57′10″N 22°04′06″E
- Country: Poland
- Voivodeship: Lublin
- County: Łuków
- Gmina: Stoczek Łukowski

Stary Jamielnik [ˈstarɨ jaˈmjɛlnik] is a village in the administrative district of Gmina Stoczek Łukowski, within Łuków County, Lublin Voivodeship, in eastern Poland.
