= Wojny-Szuby Szlacheckie =

- Village
- Location within Poland
- Coordinates: 52°48′15″N 22°34′04″E
- Country: Poland
- Voivodeship: Podlaskie
- County: Wysokie Mazowieckie
- Gmina: Szepietowo

Wojny-Szuby Szlacheckie (Polish pronunciation: [ˈvɔjnɨ ˈʂubɨ ʂlaˈxɛtskʲɛ]) is a village in the administrative district of Gmina Szepietowo, within Wysokie Mazowieckie County, Podlaskie Voivodeship, in north-eastern Poland.
