= Celej =

- Village
- Location within Poland
- Coordinates: 51°55′19″N 21°59′42″E
- Country: Poland
- Voivodeship: Lublin
- County: Łuków
- Gmina: Stoczek Łukowski

Celej [ˈt͡sɛlɛi̯] is a village in the administrative district of Gmina Stoczek Łukowski, within Łuków County, Lublin Voivodeship, in eastern Poland.
