= Stare Gierałty =

- Village
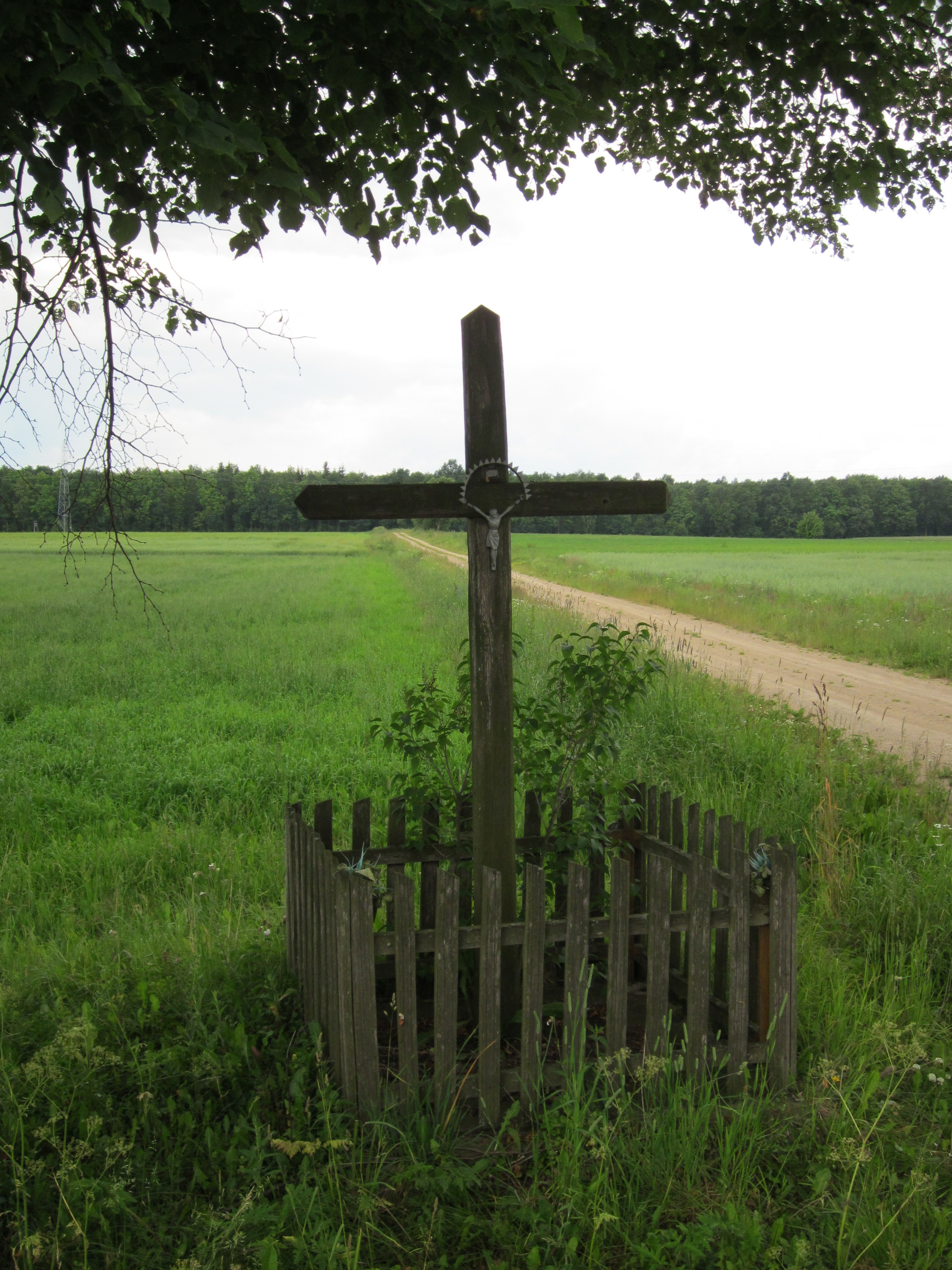
- The cross is currently located on the district road of Średnio Pawłowięta - Dąbrówka Kościelna. In front of this cross, there is a dirt road that led to the headquarters of the Stare Gierałty 134 estate.

- Location within Poland
- Coordinates: 52°51′29″N 22°33′43″E
- Country: Poland
- Voivodeship: Podlaskie
- County: Wysokie Mazowieckie
- Gmina: Szepietowo

Stare Gierałty [ˈstarɛ ɡʲɛˈrau̯tɨ] is a village in the administrative district of Gmina Szepietowo, within Wysokie Mazowieckie County, Podlaskie Voivodeship, in north-eastern Poland.
