= Szepietowo-Janówka =

- Village
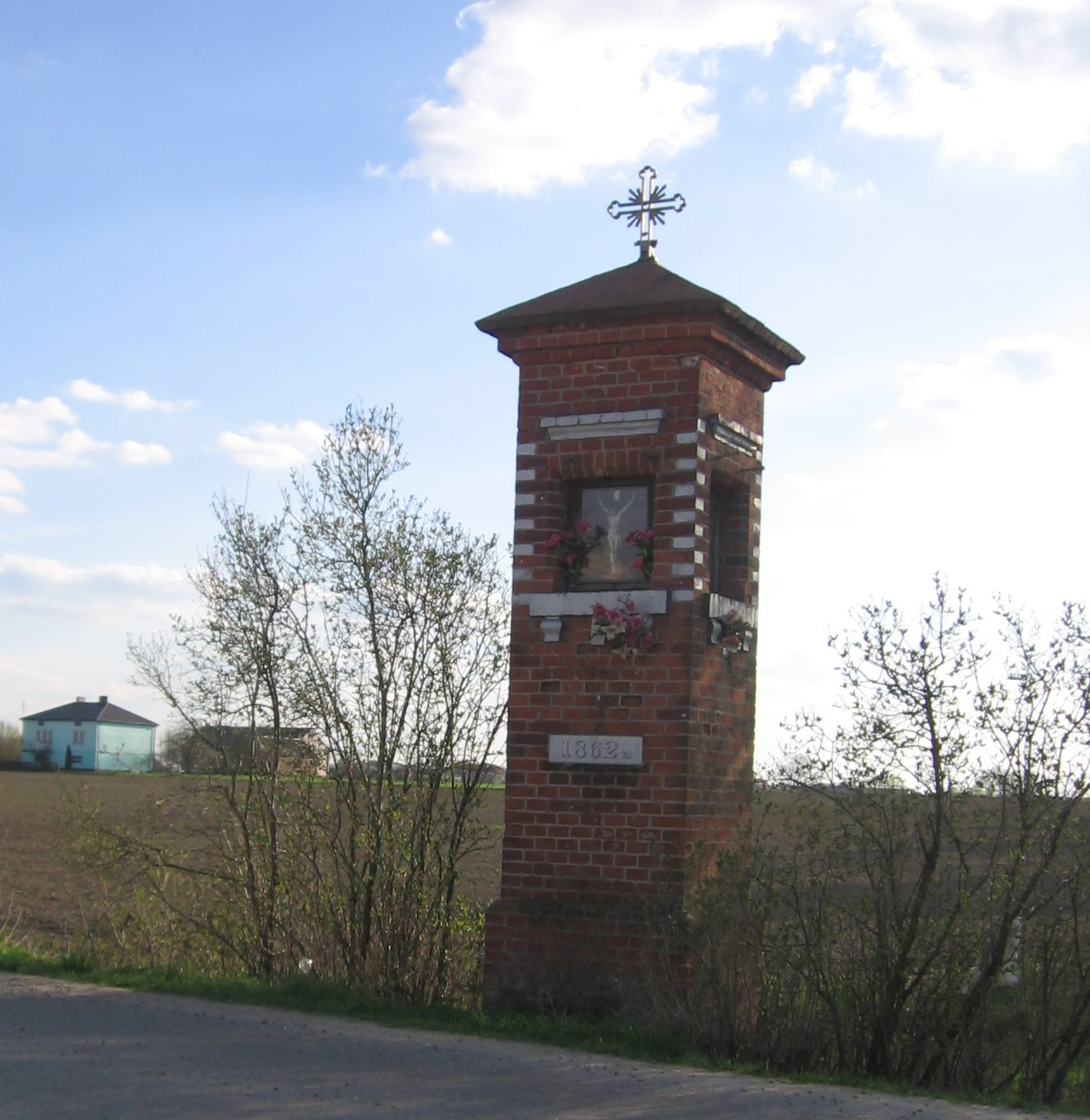

- Location within Poland
- Coordinates: 52°51′19″N 22°30′40″E
- Country: Poland
- Voivodeship: Podlaskie
- County: Wysokie Mazowieckie
- Gmina: Szepietowo

Szepietowo-Janówka [ʂɛpjɛˈtɔvɔ jaˈnufka] is a village in the administrative district of Gmina Szepietowo, within Wysokie Mazowieckie County, Podlaskie Voivodeship, in north-eastern Poland.
