= Wojny-Szuby Włościańskie =

- Village
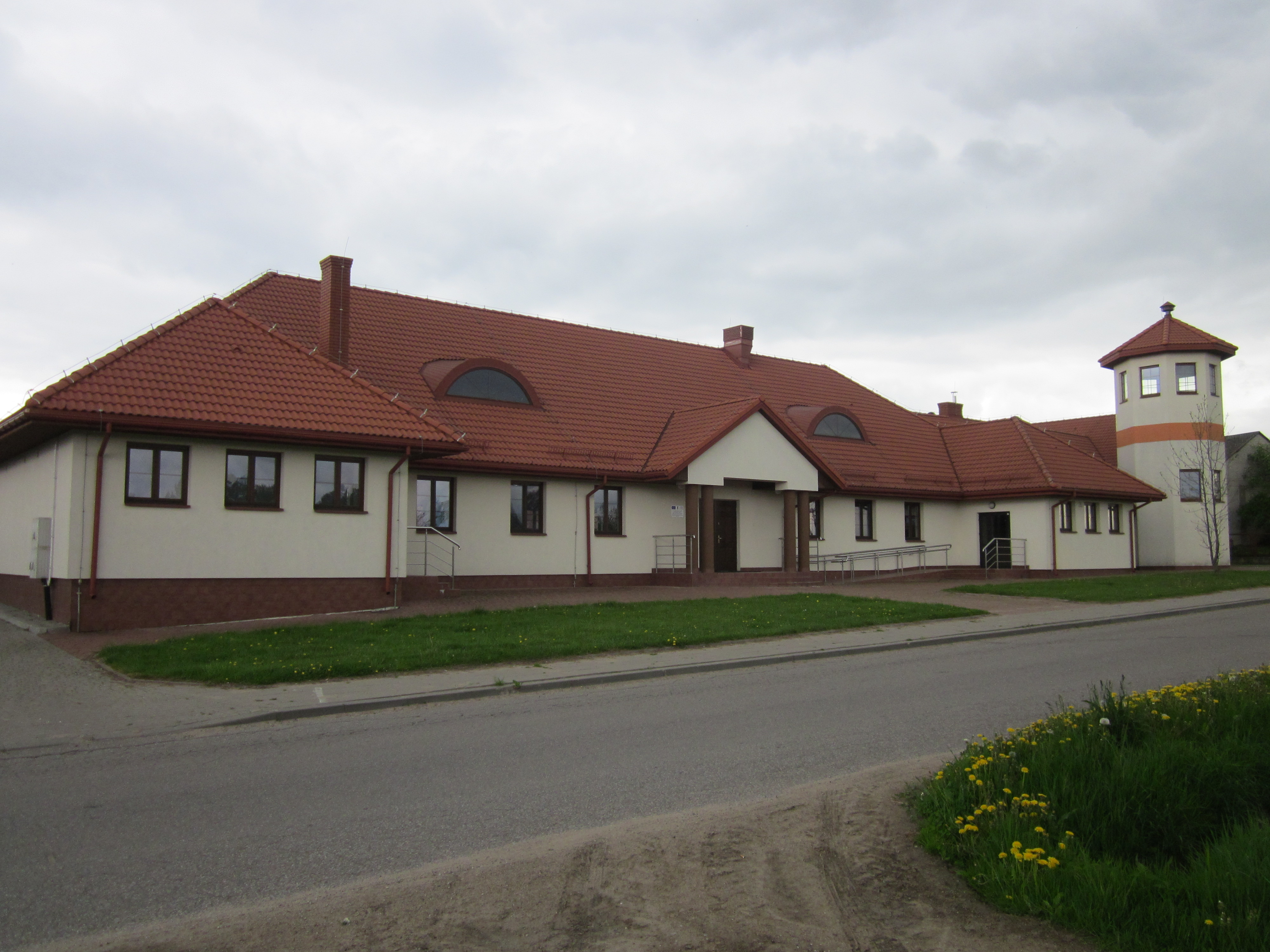

- Location within Poland
- Coordinates: 52°48′20″N 22°33′27″E
- Country: Poland
- Voivodeship: Podlaskie
- County: Wysokie Mazowieckie
- Gmina: Szepietowo

Wojny-Szuby Włościańskie (Polish pronunciation: [ˈvɔjnɨ ˈʂubɨ vwɔɕˈtɕaj̃skʲɛ]) is a village in the administrative district of Gmina Szepietowo, within Wysokie Mazowieckie County, Podlaskie Voivodeship, in north-eastern Poland. It is located about 55 kilometers south west of the city of Białystok, the Voivodeship capital.
