= Stawiereje-Michałowięta =

- Village
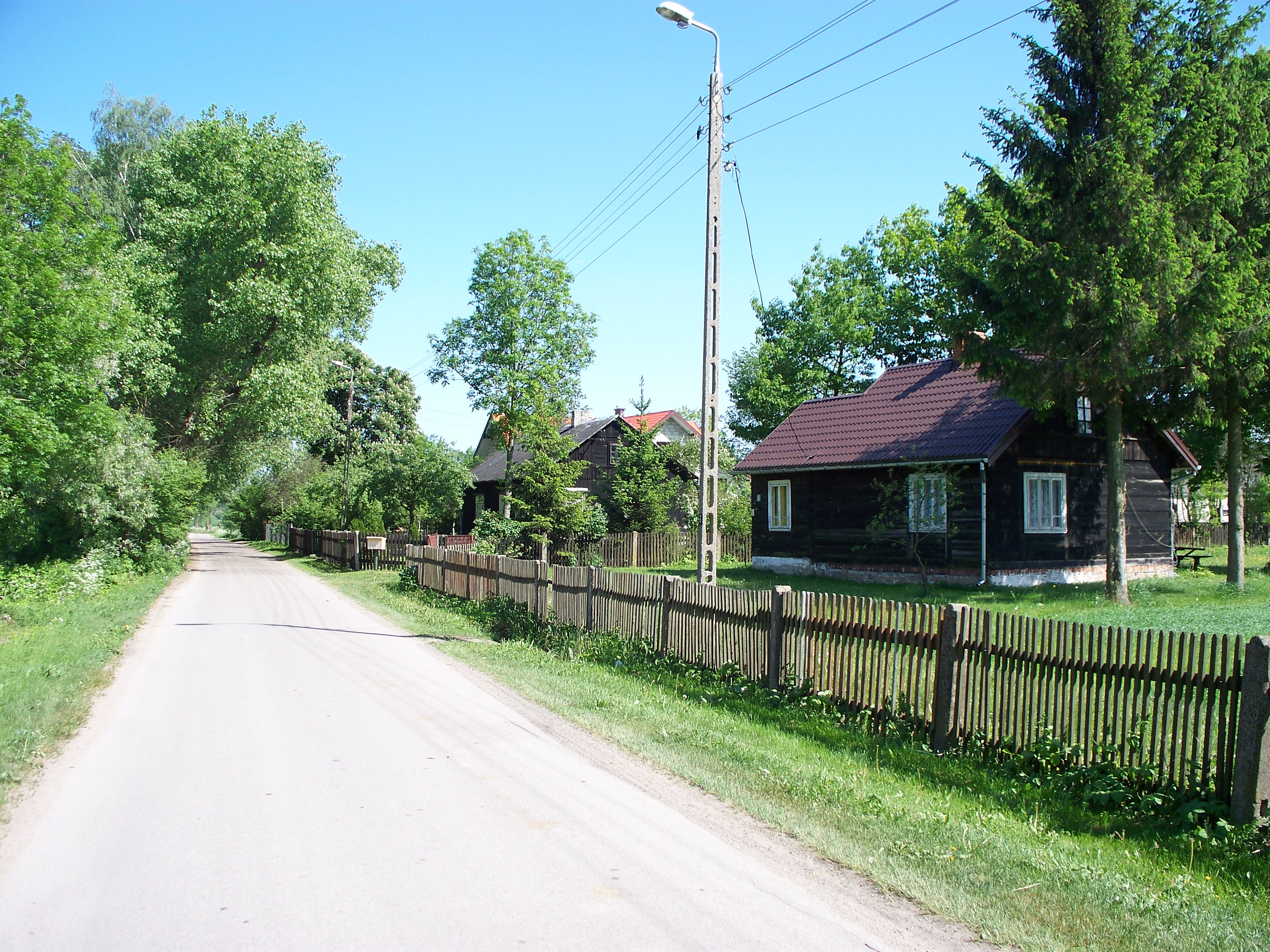

- Location within Poland
- Coordinates: 52°52′38″N 22°37′06″E
- Country: Poland
- Voivodeship: Podlaskie
- County: Wysokie Mazowieckie
- Gmina: Szepietowo
- Time zone: UTC+1 (CET)
  - Summer (DST): UTC+2 (CEST)

Stawiereje-Michałowięta [stavjɛˈrɛjɛ mixawɔˈvjɛnta] is a village in the administrative district of Gmina Szepietowo, within Wysokie Mazowieckie County, Podlaskie Voivodeship, in north-eastern Poland.

== History ==
Three Polish citizens were murdered by Nazi Germany in the village during World War II.
