= Średnica-Pawłowięta =

- Village
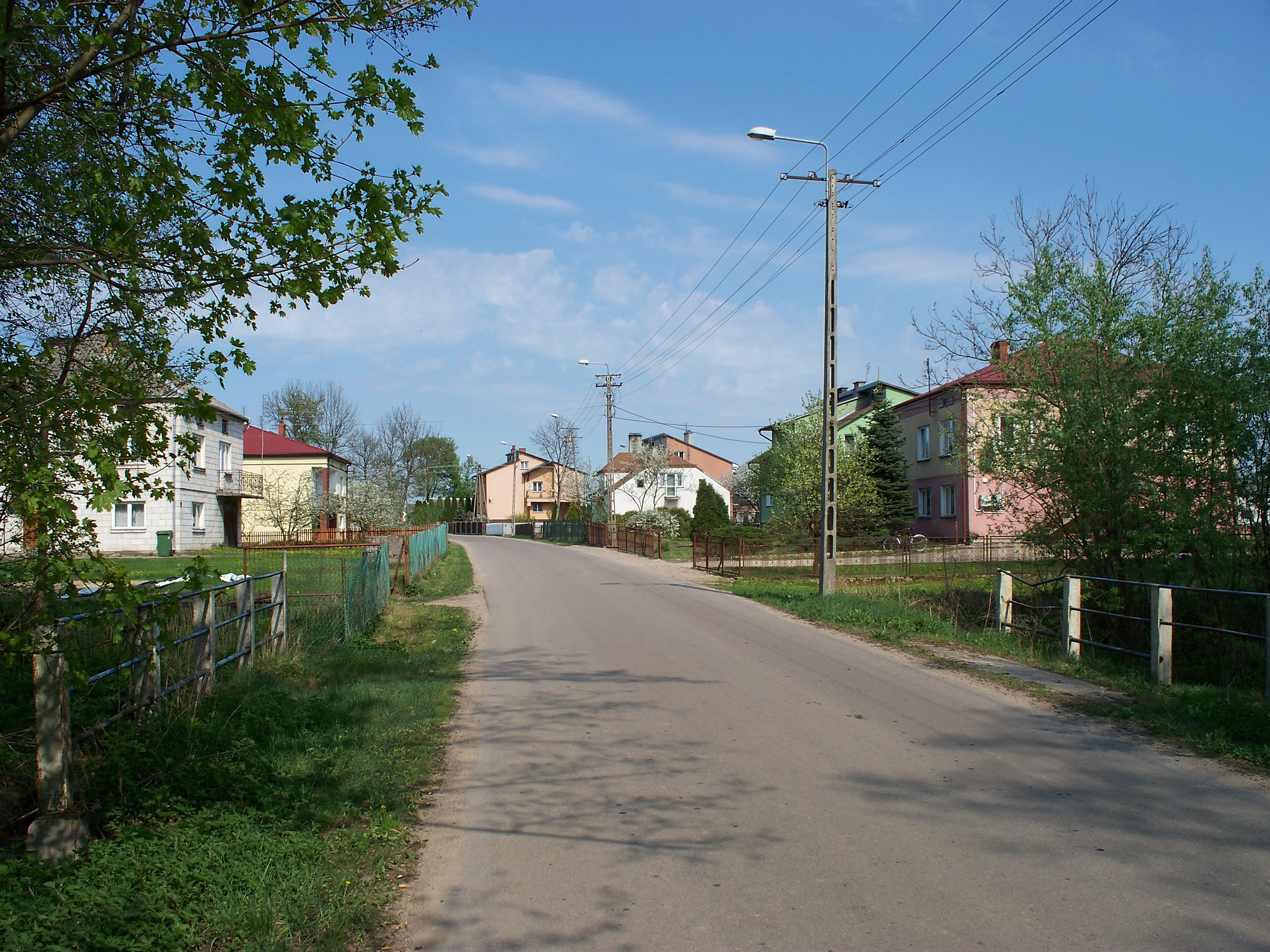

- Location within Poland
- Coordinates: 52°52′26″N 22°34′06″E
- Country: Poland
- Voivodeship: Podlaskie
- County: Wysokie Mazowieckie
- Gmina: Szepietowo

Średnica-Pawłowięta [ɕrɛdˈnit͡sa pavwɔˈvjɛnta] is a village in the administrative district of Gmina Szepietowo, within Wysokie Mazowieckie County, Podlaskie Voivodeship, in north-eastern Poland.
