= Borki, Łuków County =

Borki
- Village
- Location within Poland
- Coordinates: 51°55′N 21°57′E
- Country: Poland
- Voivodeship: Lublin
- County: Łuków
- Gmina: Stoczek Łukowski

Borki [ˈbɔrki] is a village in the administrative district of Gmina Stoczek Łukowski, within Łuków County, Lublin Voivodeship, in eastern Poland.
