= Nowe Gierałty =

- Village
- Location within Poland
- Coordinates: 52°51′N 22°33′E
- Country: Poland
- Voivodeship: Podlaskie
- County: Wysokie Mazowieckie
- Gmina: Szepietowo

Nowe Gierałty [ˈnɔvɛ ɡʲɛˈrau̯tɨ] is a village in the administrative district of Gmina Szepietowo, within Wysokie Mazowieckie County, Podlaskie Voivodeship, in north-eastern Poland.
