= Moczydły-Stanisławowięta =

- Village
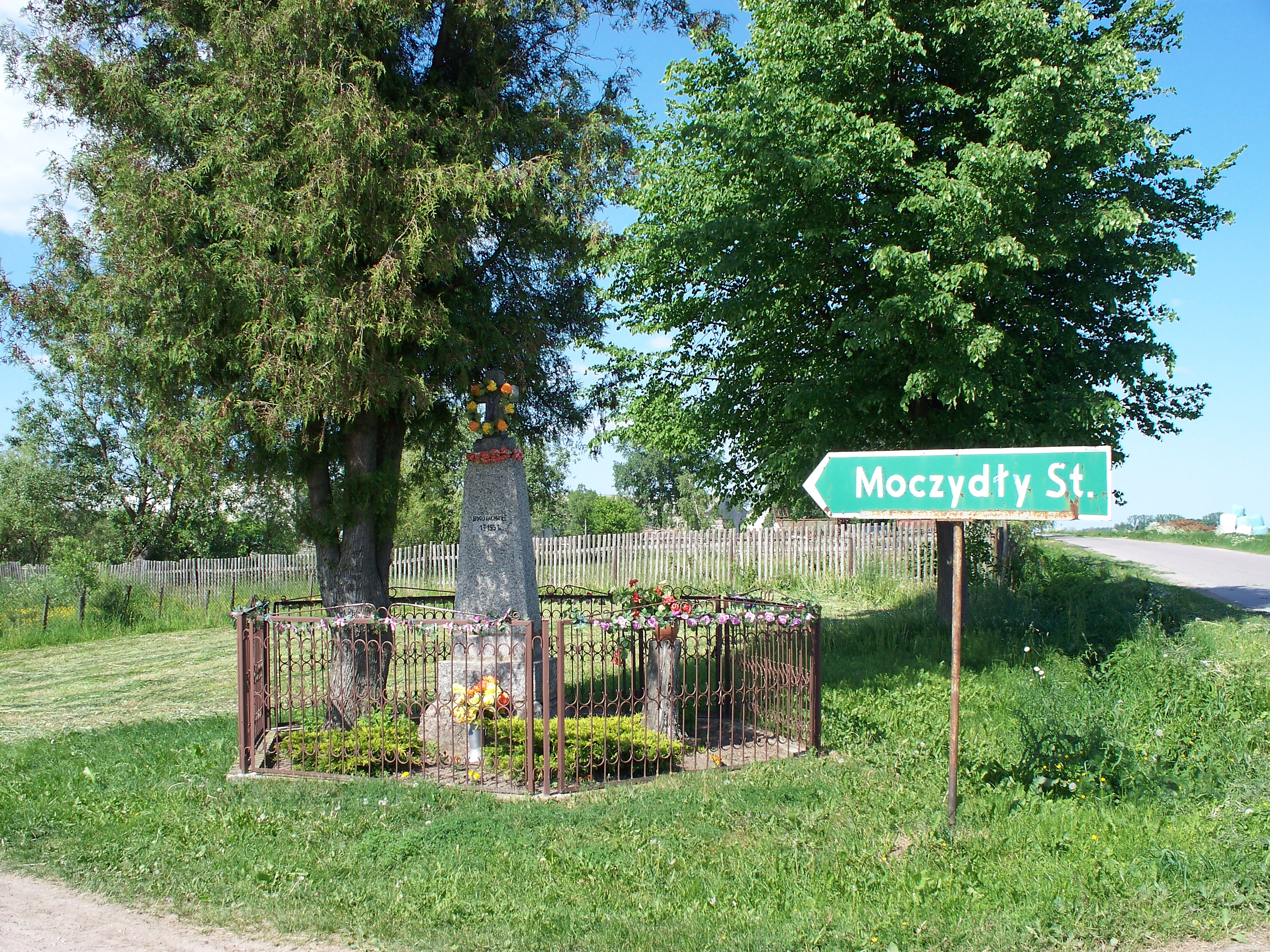
- Road sign in Moczydły-Stanisławowięta

- Location within Poland
- Coordinates: 52°52′59″N 22°37′24″E
- Country: Poland
- Voivodeship: Podlaskie
- County: Wysokie Mazowieckie
- Gmina: Szepietowo

Moczydły-Stanisławowięta [mɔˈt͡ʂɨdwɨ staniswavɔˈvjɛnta] is a village in the administrative district of Gmina Szepietowo, within Wysokie Mazowieckie County, Podlaskie Voivodeship, in north-eastern Poland.
