= Wojny-Wawrzyńce =

- Village
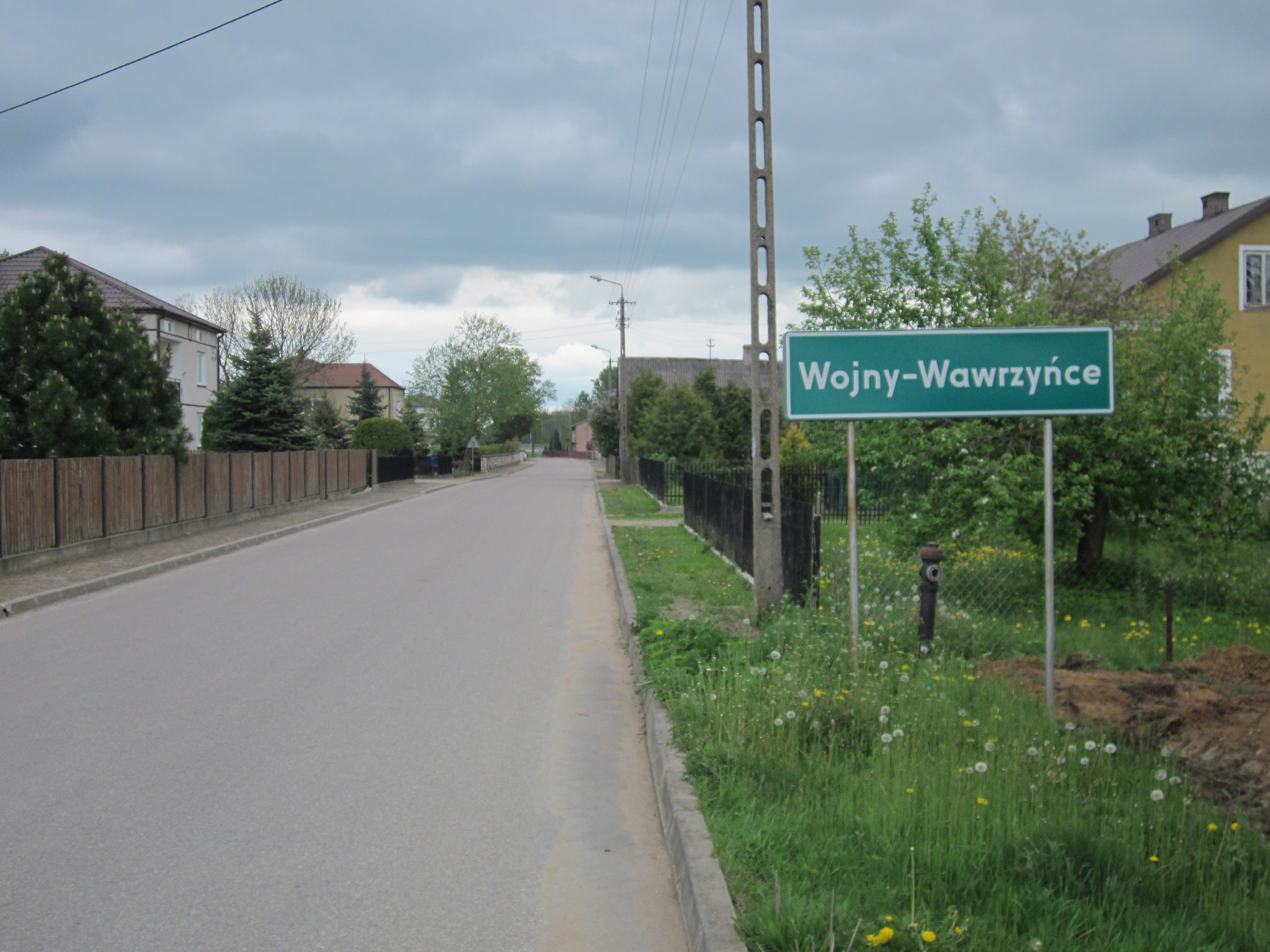
- Roadsign in Wojny-Wawrzyńce

- Location within Poland
- Coordinates: 52°48′03″N 22°34′39″E
- Country: Poland
- Voivodeship: Podlaskie
- County: Wysokie Mazowieckie
- Gmina: Szepietowo

Wojny-Wawrzyńce (Polish pronunciation: [ˈvɔjnɨ vaˈvʐɨj̃tsɛ]) is a village in the administrative district of Gmina Szepietowo, within Wysokie Mazowieckie County, Podlaskie Voivodeship, in north-eastern Poland.
