= Nowe Zalesie, Wysokie Mazowieckie County =

Nowe Zalesie
- Village
- Location within Poland
- Coordinates: 52°49′22″N 22°37′42″E
- Country: Poland
- Voivodeship: Podlaskie
- County: Wysokie Mazowieckie
- Gmina: Szepietowo

Nowe Zalesie [ˈnɔvɛ zaˈlɛɕɛ] is a village in the administrative district of Gmina Szepietowo, within Wysokie Mazowieckie County, Podlaskie Voivodeship, in north-eastern Poland.
