= Mizary =

- Village
- Location within Poland
- Coordinates: 51°56′N 21°56′E
- Country: Poland
- Voivodeship: Lublin
- County: Łuków
- Gmina: Stoczek Łukowski
- Elevation: 183 m (600 ft)
- Population: 360

Mizary [miˈzarɨ] is a village in the administrative district of Gmina Stoczek Łukowski, within Łuków County, Lublin Voivodeship, in eastern Poland.
