= Stara Róża =

- Village
- Location within Poland
- Coordinates: 51°58′45″N 22°05′15″E
- Country: Poland
- Voivodeship: Lublin
- County: Łuków
- Gmina: Stoczek Łukowski

Stara Róża [ˈstara ˈruʐa] is a village in the administrative district of Gmina Stoczek Łukowski, within Łuków County, Lublin Voivodeship, in eastern Poland.
