= Wojny-Pietrasze =

- Village
- Location within Poland
- Coordinates: 52°47′45″N 22°34′40″E
- Country: Poland
- Voivodeship: Podlaskie
- County: Wysokie Mazowieckie
- Gmina: Szepietowo

Wojny-Pietrasze (Polish pronunciation: [ˈvɔjnɨ pjɛˈtraʂɛ]) is a village in the administrative district of Gmina Szepietowo, within Wysokie Mazowieckie County, Podlaskie Voivodeship, in north-eastern Poland.
