= Dąbrowa-Kaski =

- Village
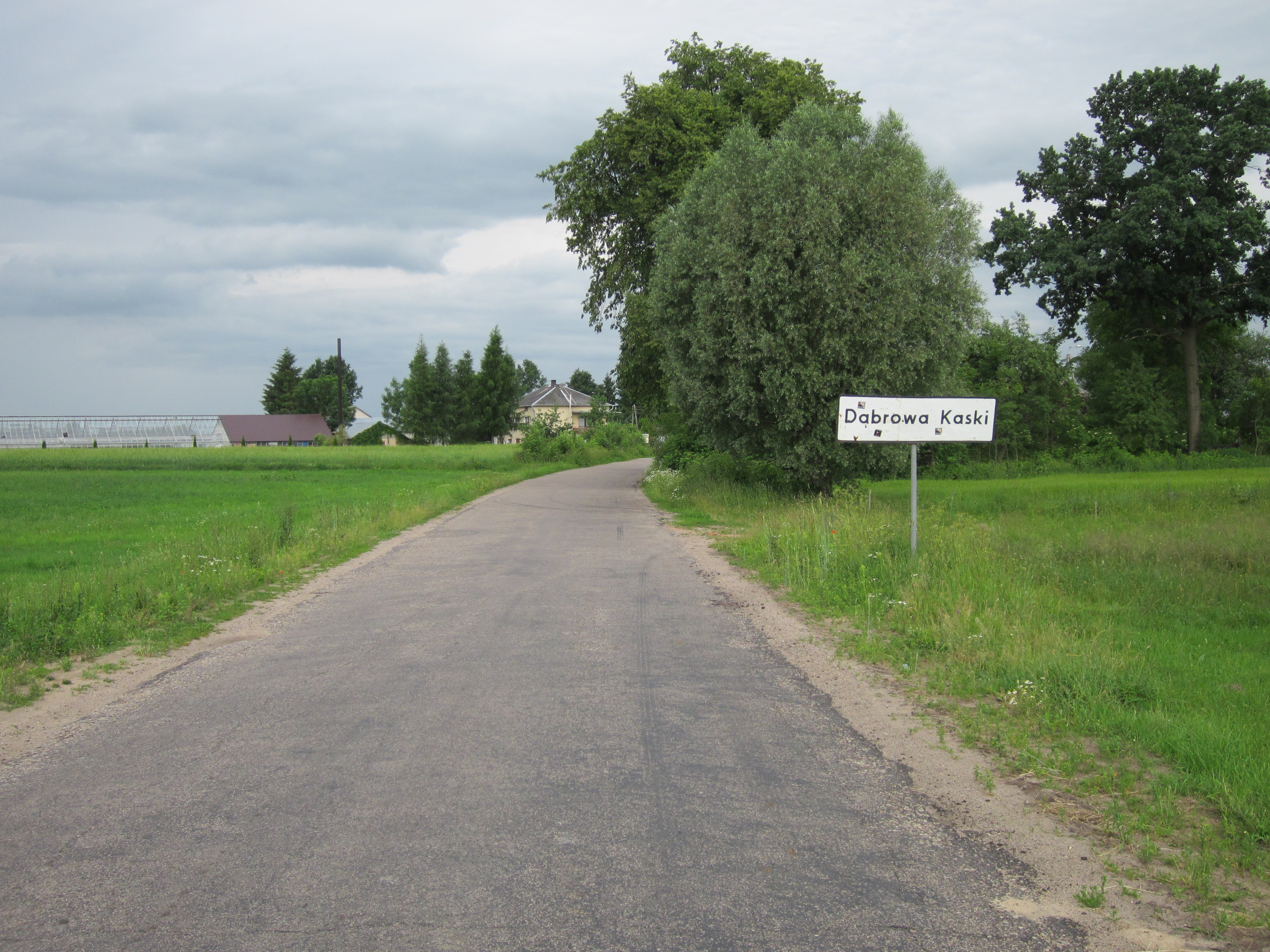
- Road sign in Dąbrowa Kaski

- Location within Poland
- Coordinates: 52°50′45″N 22°26′07″E
- Country: Poland
- Voivodeship: Podlaskie
- County: Wysokie Mazowieckie
- Gmina: Szepietowo
- Postal code: 18-210
- Vehicle registration: BWM

Dąbrowa-Kaski [dɔmˈbrɔva ˈkaski] is a village in the administrative district of Gmina Szepietowo, within Wysokie Mazowieckie County, Podlaskie Voivodeship, in north-eastern Poland.

Seven Polish citizens were murdered by Nazi Germany in the village during World War II.
