= Rosy, Poland =

Rosy
- Village
- Location within Poland
- Coordinates: 52°0′N 22°4′E
- Country: Poland
- Voivodeship: Lublin
- County: Łuków
- Gmina: Stoczek Łukowski

Rosy [ˈrɔsɨ] is a village in the administrative district of Gmina Stoczek Łukowski, within Łuków County, Lublin Voivodeship, in eastern Poland.
