= Wojny-Piecki =

- Village
- Location within Poland
- Coordinates: 52°50′59″N 22°35′56″E
- Country: Poland
- Voivodeship: Podlaskie
- County: Wysokie Mazowieckie
- Gmina: Szepietowo

Wojny-Piecki (Polish pronunciation: [ˈvɔjnɨ ˈpjɛtskʲi]) is a village in the administrative district of Gmina Szepietowo, within Wysokie Mazowieckie County, Podlaskie Voivodeship, in north-eastern Poland.
