= Chorążyce, Podlaskie Voivodeship =

Chorążyce
- Village
- Location within Poland
- Coordinates: 52°48′52″N 22°37′28″E
- Country: Poland
- Voivodeship: Podlaskie
- County: Wysokie Mazowieckie
- Gmina: Szepietowo

Chorążyce [xɔrɔ̃ˈʐɨt͡sɛ] is a village in the administrative district of Gmina Szepietowo, within Wysokie Mazowieckie County, Podlaskie Voivodeship, in north-eastern Poland.
