= Dąbrówka Kościelna, Podlaskie Voivodeship =

Dąbrówka Kościelna
- Village
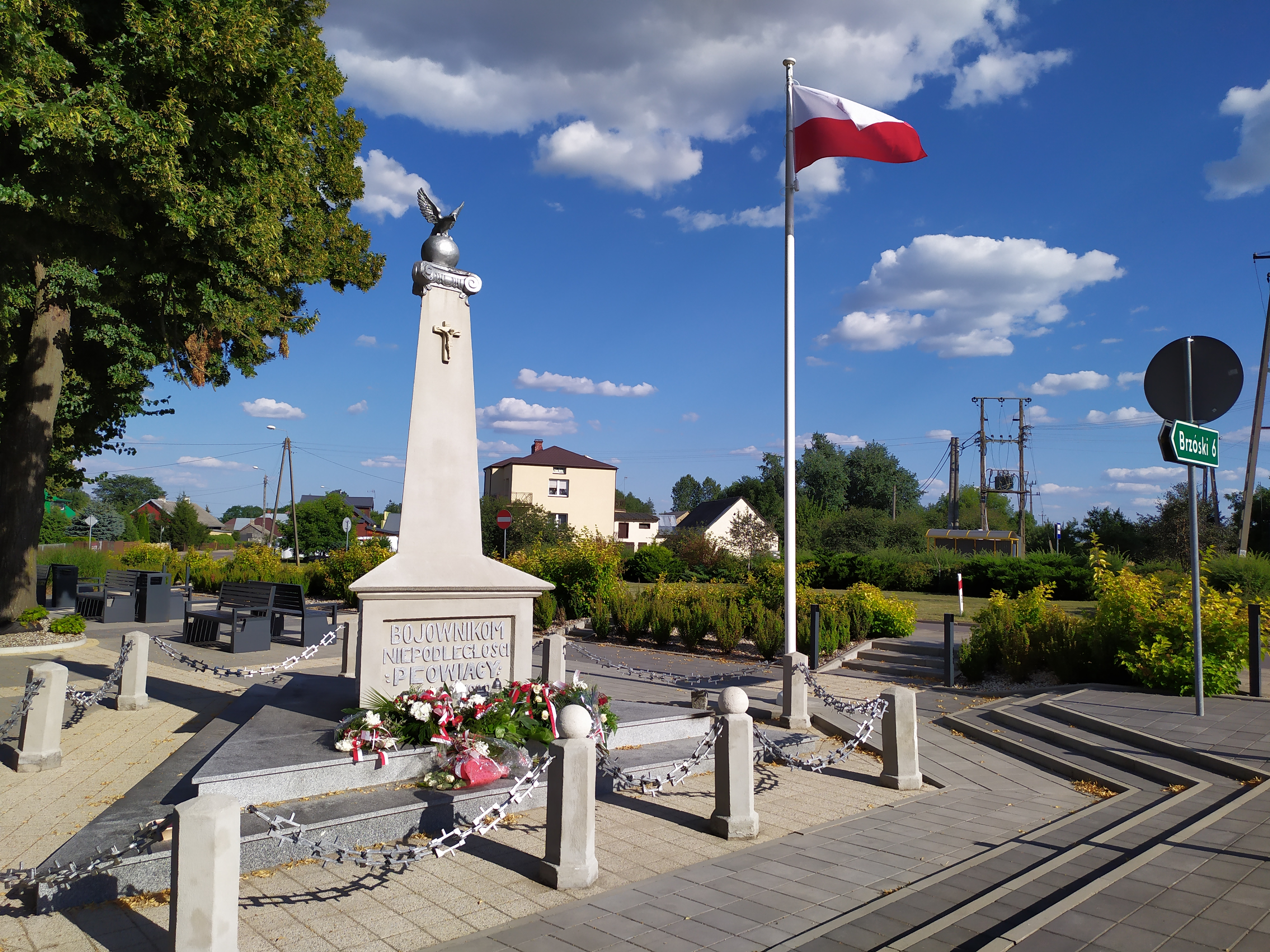
- Polish Military Organisation Monument in Dąbrówka Kościelna

- Location within Poland
- Coordinates: 52°51′15″N 22°34′37″E
- Country: Poland
- Voivodeship: Podlaskie
- County: Wysokie Mazowieckie
- Gmina: Szepietowo
- Time zone: UTC+1 (CET)
  - Summer (DST): UTC+2 (CEST)
- Postal code: 18-210
- Vehicle registration: BWM

Dąbrówka Kościelna [dɔmˈbrufka kɔɕˈt͡ɕɛlna] is a village in the administrative district of Gmina Szepietowo, within Wysokie Mazowieckie County, Podlaskie Voivodeship, in north-eastern Poland.
