= Stary Kamień, Podlaskie Voivodeship =

Stary Kamień
- Village
- Location within Poland
- Coordinates: 52°52′10″N 22°26′24″E
- Country: Poland
- Voivodeship: Podlaskie
- County: Wysokie Mazowieckie
- Gmina: Szepietowo

Stary Kamień (Polish pronunciation: [ˈstarɨ ˈkamjɛj̃]) is a village in the administrative district of Gmina Szepietowo, within Wysokie Mazowieckie County, Podlaskie Voivodeship, in north-eastern Poland.
