= Dąbrowa-Moczydły =

- Village
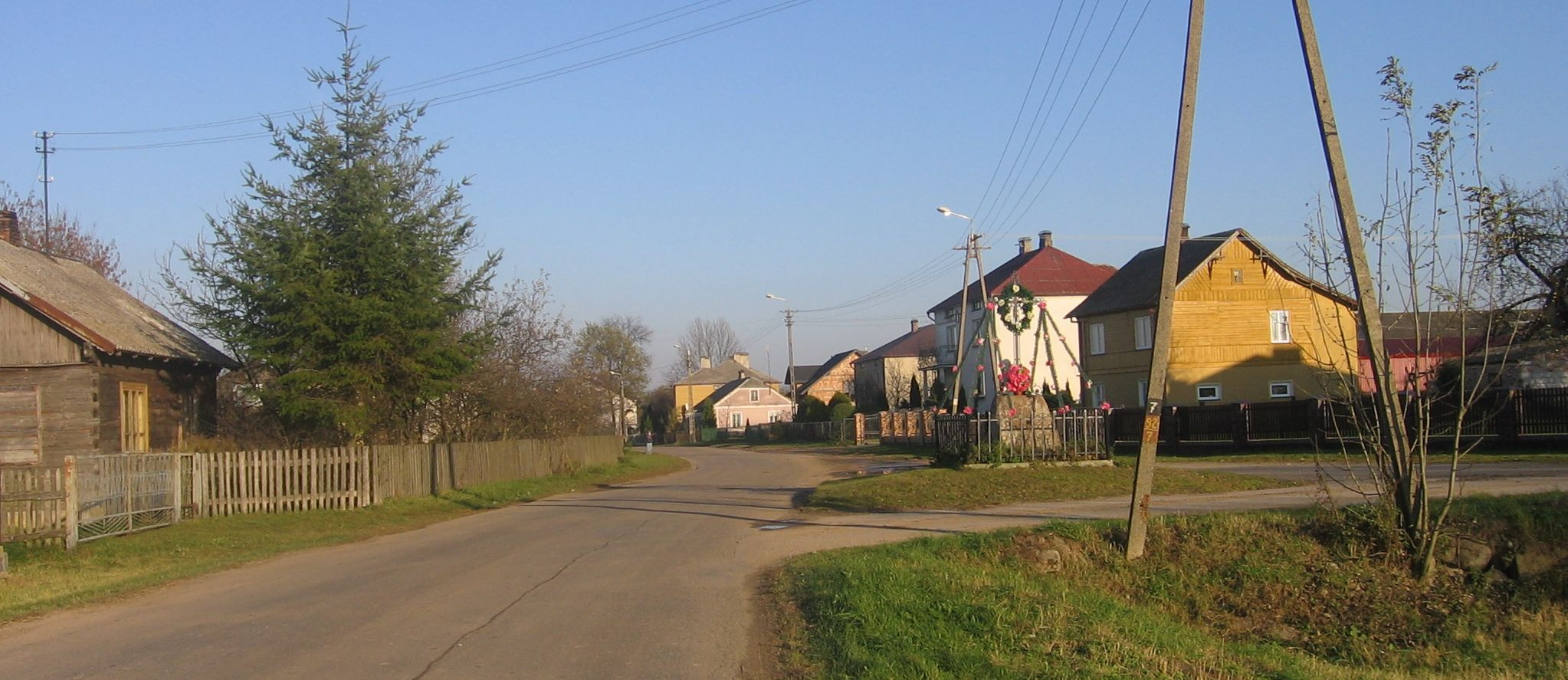

- Location within Poland
- Coordinates: 52°50′26″N 22°30′6″E
- Country: Poland
- Voivodeship: Podlaskie
- County: Wysokie Mazowieckie
- Gmina: Szepietowo
- Postal code: 18-210
- Vehicle registration: BWM

Dąbrowa-Moczydły [dɔmˈbrɔva mɔˈt͡ʂɨdwɨ] is a village in the administrative district of Gmina Szepietowo, within Wysokie Mazowieckie County, Podlaskie Voivodeship, in north-eastern Poland.
