= Szymbory-Andrzejowięta =

- Village
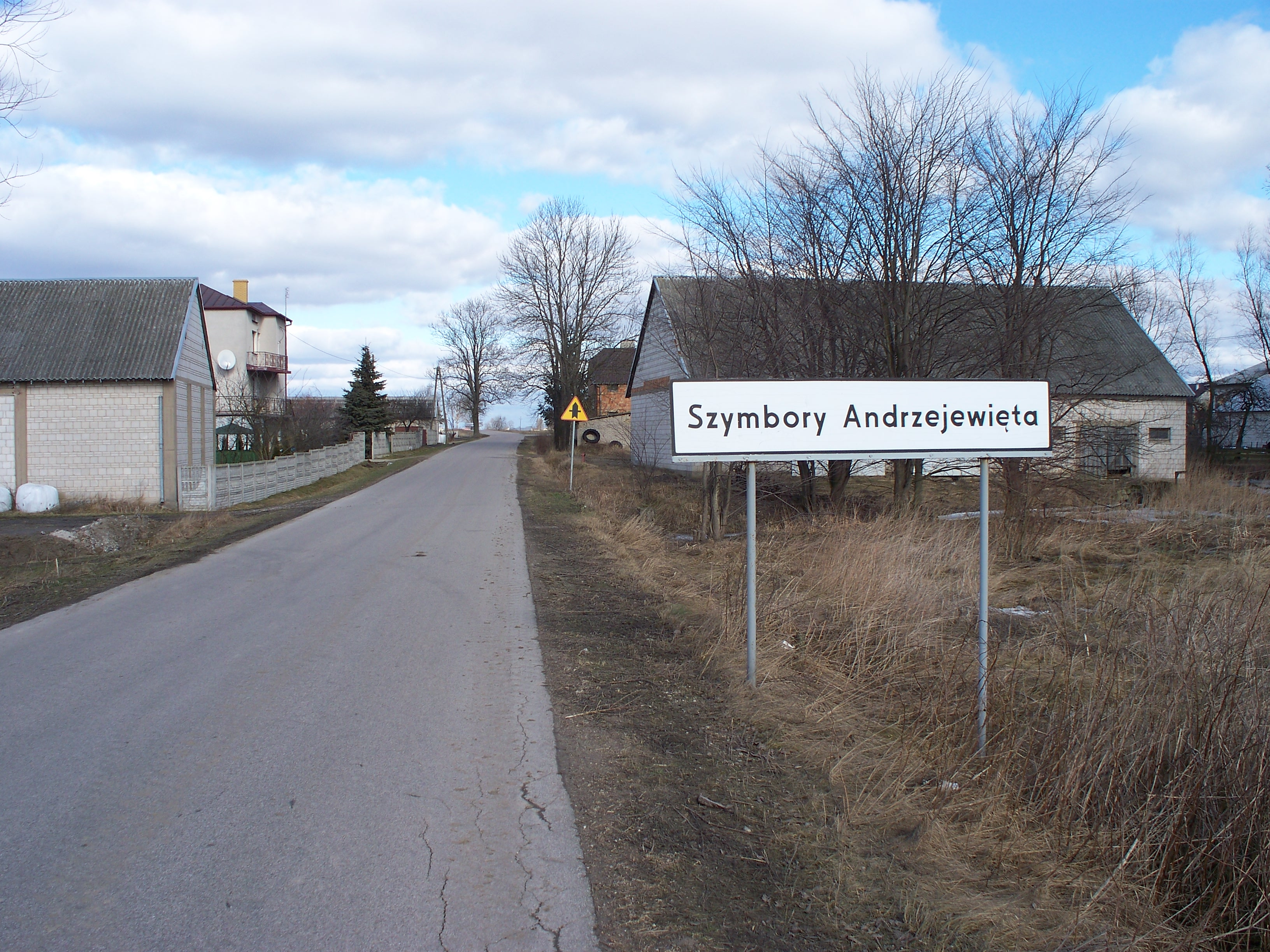

- Location within Poland
- Coordinates: 52°53′53″N 22°36′03″E
- Country: Poland
- Voivodeship: Podlaskie
- County: Wysokie Mazowieckie
- Gmina: Szepietowo

Szymbory-Andrzejowięta (Polish pronunciation: [ʂɨmˈbɔrɨ andʐɛjɔˈvjɛnta]) is a village in the administrative district of Gmina Szepietowo, within Wysokie Mazowieckie County, Podlaskie Voivodeship, in north-eastern Poland.
