= Dąbrowa-Dołęgi =

- Village
- Location within Poland
- Coordinates: 52°52′N 22°29′E
- Country: Poland
- Voivodeship: Podlaskie
- County: Wysokie Mazowieckie
- Gmina: Szepietowo

Population
  - Total: 120
- Postal code: 18-210
- Vehicle registration: BWM

Dąbrowa-Dołęgi (Polish pronunciation: [dɔmˈbrɔva dɔˈwɛnɡʲi]) is a village in the administrative district of Gmina Szepietowo, within Wysokie Mazowieckie County, Podlaskie Voivodeship, in north-eastern Poland.
