= Wojny-Izdebnik =

- Village
- Location within Poland
- Coordinates: 52°49′52″N 22°33′38″E
- Country: Poland
- Voivodeship: Podlaskie
- County: Wysokie Mazowieckie
- Gmina: Szepietowo

Wojny-Izdebnik (Polish pronunciation: [ˈvɔjnɨ izˈdɛbɲik]) is a village in the administrative district of Gmina Szepietowo, within Wysokie Mazowieckie County, Podlaskie Voivodeship, in north-eastern Poland.
