= Dąbrowa-Zabłotne =

- Village
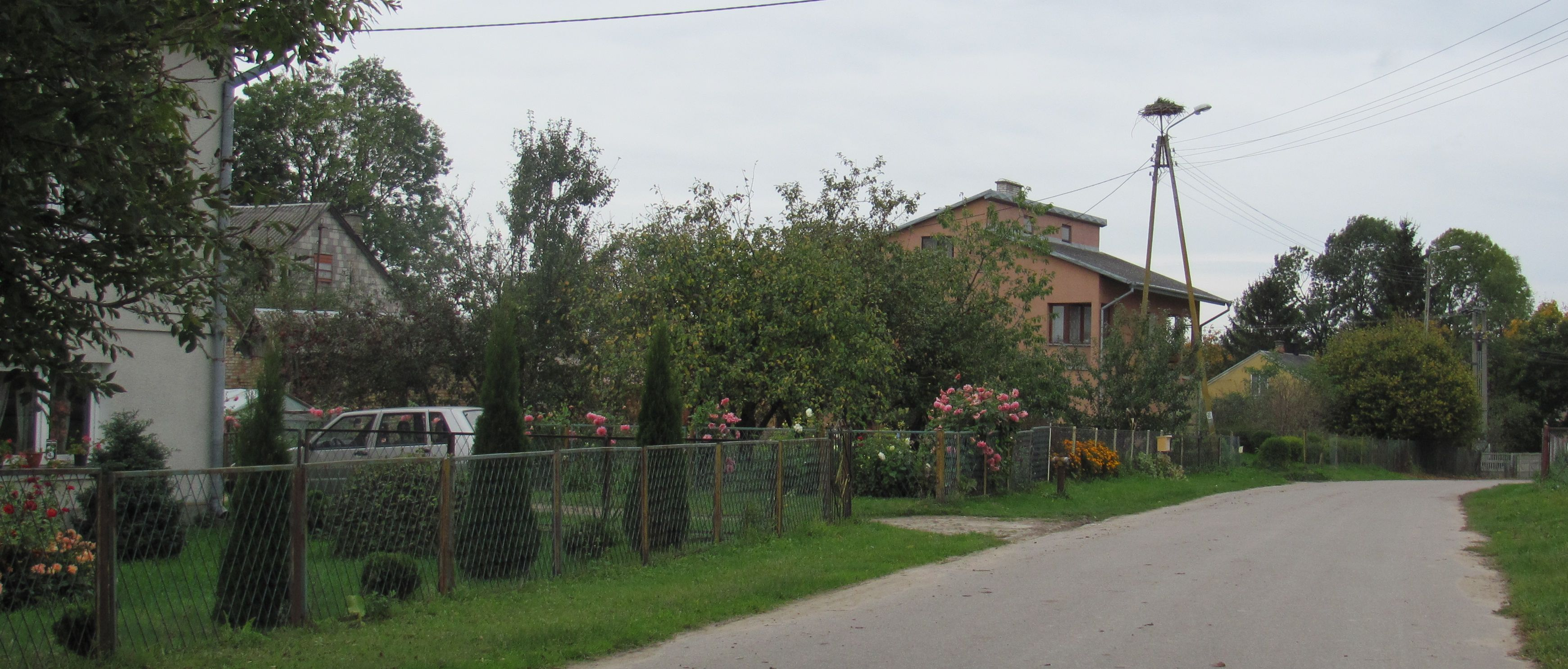
- Houses near the pond

- Location within Poland
- Coordinates: 52°51′02″N 22°25′48″E
- Country: Poland
- Voivodeship: Podlaskie
- County: Wysokie Mazowieckie
- Gmina: Szepietowo
- Postal code: 18-210
- Vehicle registration: BWM

Dąbrowa-Zabłotne [dɔmˈbrɔva zaˈbwɔtnɛ] is a village in the administrative district of Gmina Szepietowo, within Wysokie Mazowieckie County, Podlaskie Voivodeship, in north-eastern Poland.
