= Zgórznica =

- Village
- Location within Poland
- Coordinates: 51°59′N 22°0′E
- Country: Poland
- Voivodeship: Lublin
- County: Łuków
- Gmina: Stoczek Łukowski

Zgórznica [zɡuʐˈnit͡sa] is a village in the administrative district of Gmina Stoczek Łukowski, within Łuków County, Lublin Voivodeship, in eastern Poland.
