= Szepietowo-Wawrzyńce =

- Village
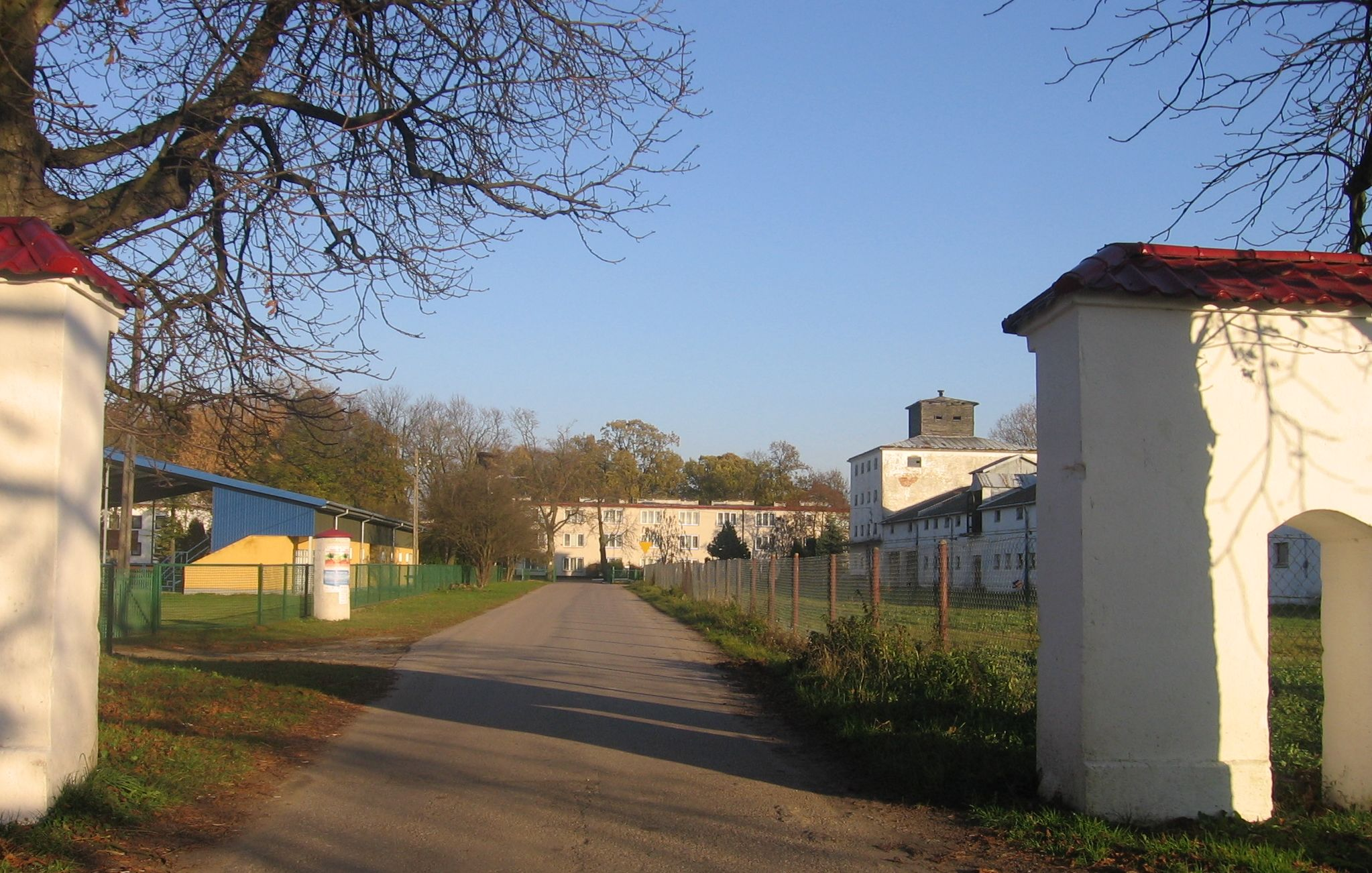

- Location within Poland
- Coordinates: 52°50′54″N 22°32′24″E
- Country: Poland
- Voivodeship: Podlaskie
- County: Wysokie Mazowieckie
- Gmina: Szepietowo

Szepietowo-Wawrzyńce (Polish pronunciation: [ʂɛpjɛˈtɔvɔ vaˈvʐɨj̃tsɛ]) is a village in the administrative district of Gmina Szepietowo, within Wysokie Mazowieckie County, Podlaskie Voivodeship, in north-eastern Poland.
