= Ruda, Gmina Stoczek Łukowski =

Ruda
- Village
- Location within Poland
- Coordinates: 51°57′32″N 22°0′35″E
- Country: Poland
- Voivodeship: Lublin
- County: Łuków
- Gmina: Stoczek Łukowski

Ruda [ˈruda] is a village in the administrative district of Gmina Stoczek Łukowski, within Łuków County, Lublin Voivodeship, in eastern Poland.
