= Kamień-Rupie =

- Village
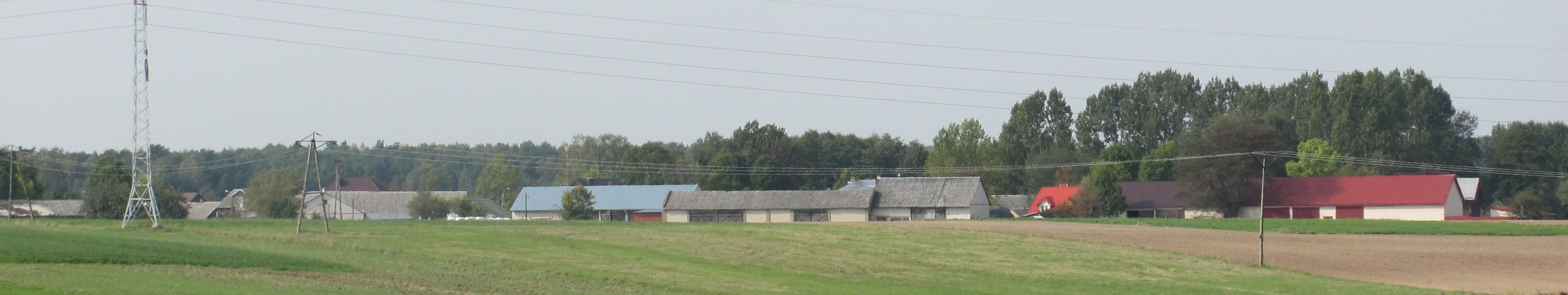
- Panoramic view of Kamień-Rupie

- Location within Poland
- Coordinates: 52°52′39″N 22°26′41″E
- Country: Poland
- Voivodeship: Podlaskie
- County: Wysokie Mazowieckie
- Gmina: Szepietowo

Kamień-Rupie (Polish pronunciation: [ˈkamjɛj̃ ˈrupjɛ]) is a village in the administrative district of Gmina Szepietowo, within Wysokie Mazowieckie County, Podlaskie Voivodeship, in north-eastern Poland.
