= Stare Kobiałki =

- Village
- Location within Poland
- Coordinates: 51°57′06″N 22°01′11″E
- Country: Poland
- Voivodeship: Lublin
- County: Łuków
- Gmina: Stoczek Łukowski

Population
  - Total: 480
- Time zone: UTC+1 (CET)
  - Summer (DST): UTC+2 (CEST)

Stare Kobiałki [ˈstarɛ kɔˈbjau̯ki] is a village in the administrative district of Gmina Stoczek Łukowski, within Łuków County, Lublin Voivodeship, in eastern Poland.

== History ==
Five Polish citizens were murdered by Nazi Germany in the village during World War II.
