= Wojny-Pogorzel =

- Village
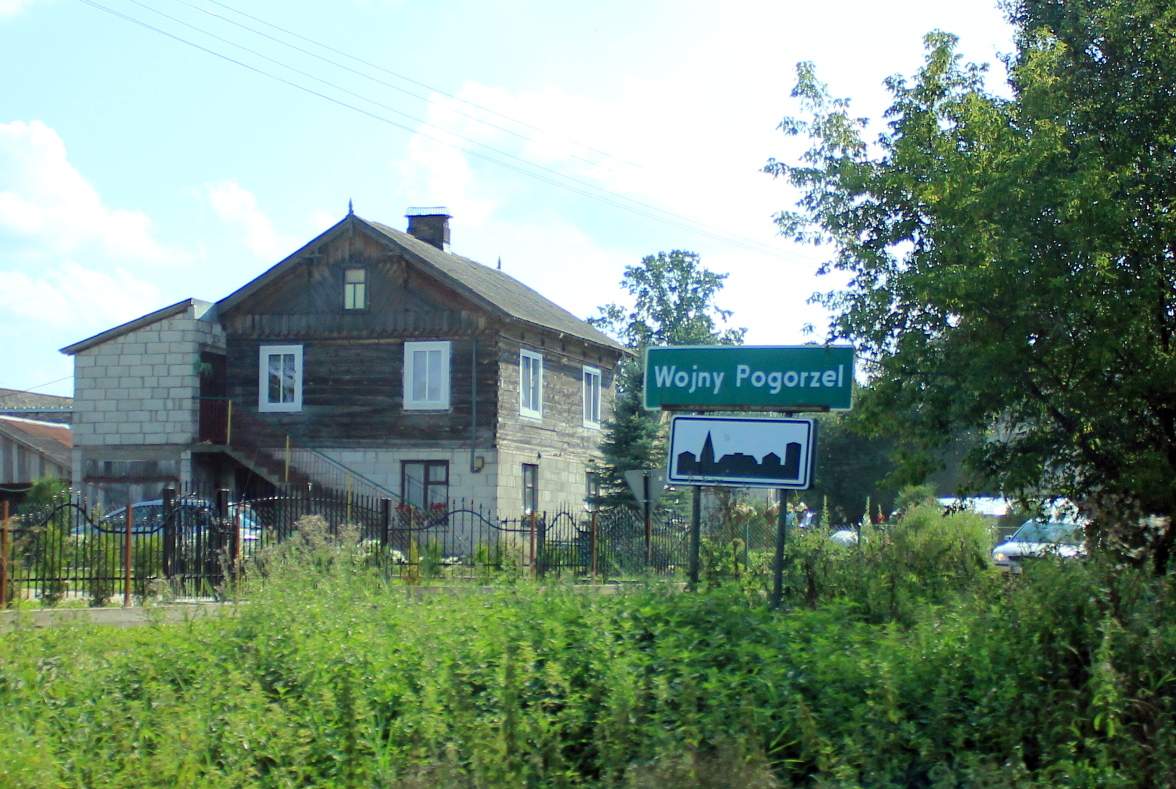

- Location within Poland
- Coordinates: 52°49′38″N 22°36′05″E
- Country: Poland
- Voivodeship: Podlaskie
- County: Wysokie Mazowieckie
- Gmina: Szepietowo

Wojny-Pogorzel (Polish pronunciation: [ˈvɔjnɨ pɔˈɡɔʐɛl]) is a village in the administrative district of Gmina Szepietowo, within Wysokie Mazowieckie County, Podlaskie Voivodeship, in north-eastern Poland.
