= Jagodne, Łuków County =

Jagodne
- Village
- Location within Poland
- Coordinates: 51°55′N 21°55′E
- Country: Poland
- Voivodeship: Lublin
- County: Łuków
- Gmina: Stoczek Łukowski

Jagodne [jaˈɡɔdnɛ] is a village in the administrative district of Gmina Stoczek Łukowski, within Łuków County, Lublin Voivodeship, in eastern Poland.
