= Łosiniec, Łuków County =

Łosiniec
- Village
- Location within Poland
- Coordinates: 51°59′32″N 22°04′06″E
- Country: Poland
- Voivodeship: Lublin
- County: Łuków
- Gmina: Stoczek Łukowski

Łosiniec [wɔˈɕiɲɛt͡s] is a village in the administrative district of Gmina Stoczek Łukowski, within Łuków County, Lublin Voivodeship, in eastern Poland.
