= Kapice, Lublin Voivodeship =

Kapice
- Village
- Location within Poland
- Coordinates: 51°55′43″N 21°51′14″E
- Country: Poland
- Voivodeship: Lublin
- County: Łuków
- Gmina: Stoczek Łukowski

Kapice [kaˈpit͡sɛ] is a village in the administrative district of Gmina Stoczek Łukowski, within Łuków County, Lublin Voivodeship, in eastern Poland.
