= Stara Prawda =

Village in Poland

- Village
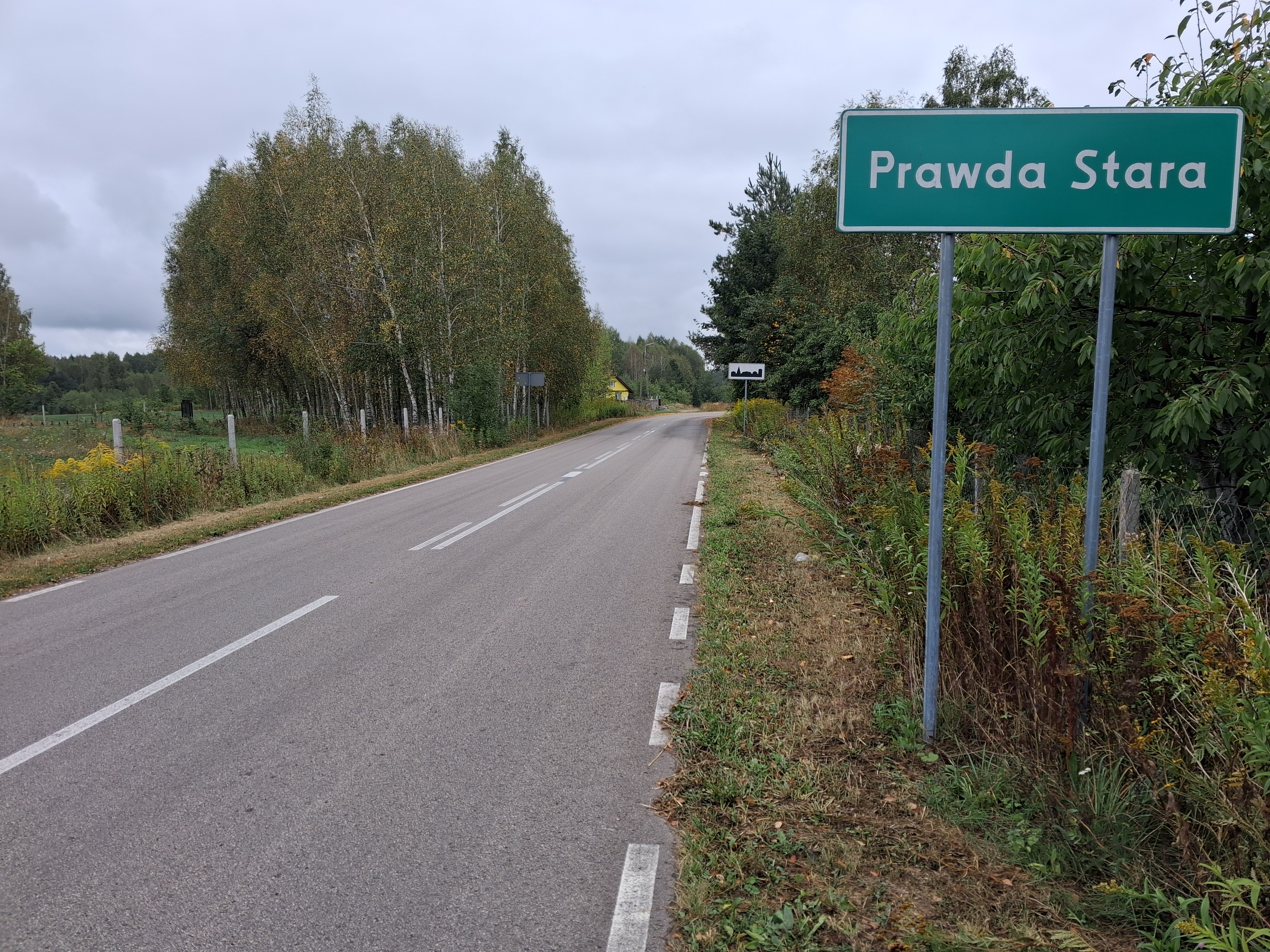

- Location within Poland
- Coordinates: 51°57′23″N 21°55′30″E
- Country: Poland
- Voivodeship: Lublin
- County: Łuków
- Gmina: Stoczek Łukowski

Population
  - Total: 243
- SIMC: 0691599

Stara Prawda [ˈstara ˈpravda] is a village in the administrative district of Gmina Stoczek Łukowski, within Łuków County, Lublin Voivodeship, in eastern Poland.
