= Zabiele, Łuków County =

Zabiele
- Village
- Location within Poland
- Coordinates: 51°57′57″N 21°59′1″E
- Country: Poland
- Voivodeship: Lublin
- County: Łuków
- Gmina: Stoczek Łukowski

Zabiele [zaˈbjɛlɛ] is a village in the administrative district of Gmina Stoczek Łukowski, within Łuków County, Lublin Voivodeship, in eastern Poland.
