= Zabiele, Wysokie Mazowieckie County =

Zabiele
- Village
- Location within Poland
- Coordinates: 52°50′59″N 22°28′30″E
- Country: Poland
- Voivodeship: Podlaskie
- County: Wysokie Mazowieckie
- Gmina: Szepietowo

Zabiele [zaˈbjɛlɛ] is a village in the administrative district of Gmina Szepietowo, within Wysokie Mazowieckie County, Podlaskie Voivodeship, in north-eastern Poland.
