= Jablon =

Jablon may refer to:

- Jabloň, Slovakia
- Jabłoń, Lublin Voivodeship, east Poland
- Jabłoń, Warmian-Masurian Voivodeship, north Poland
- Jabłoń Kościelna
- Jabłoń-Dąbrowa
- Jabłoń-Dobki
- Jabłoń-Jankowce
- Jabłoń-Kikolskie
- Jabłoń-Markowięta
- Jabłoń-Piotrowce
- Jabłoń-Rykacze
- Jabłoń-Samsony
- Jabłoń-Spały
- Jabłoń-Śliwowo
- Jabłoń-Uszyńskie
- Jabłoń-Zambrowizna
- Jabłoń-Zarzeckie
- Konopki-Jabłoń
- Nagórki-Jabłoń
- Poryte-Jabłoń
