= Krasowo-Częstki massacre =

1943 Nazi war crime in occupied Poland

- Part of the Nazi crimes against the Polish nation
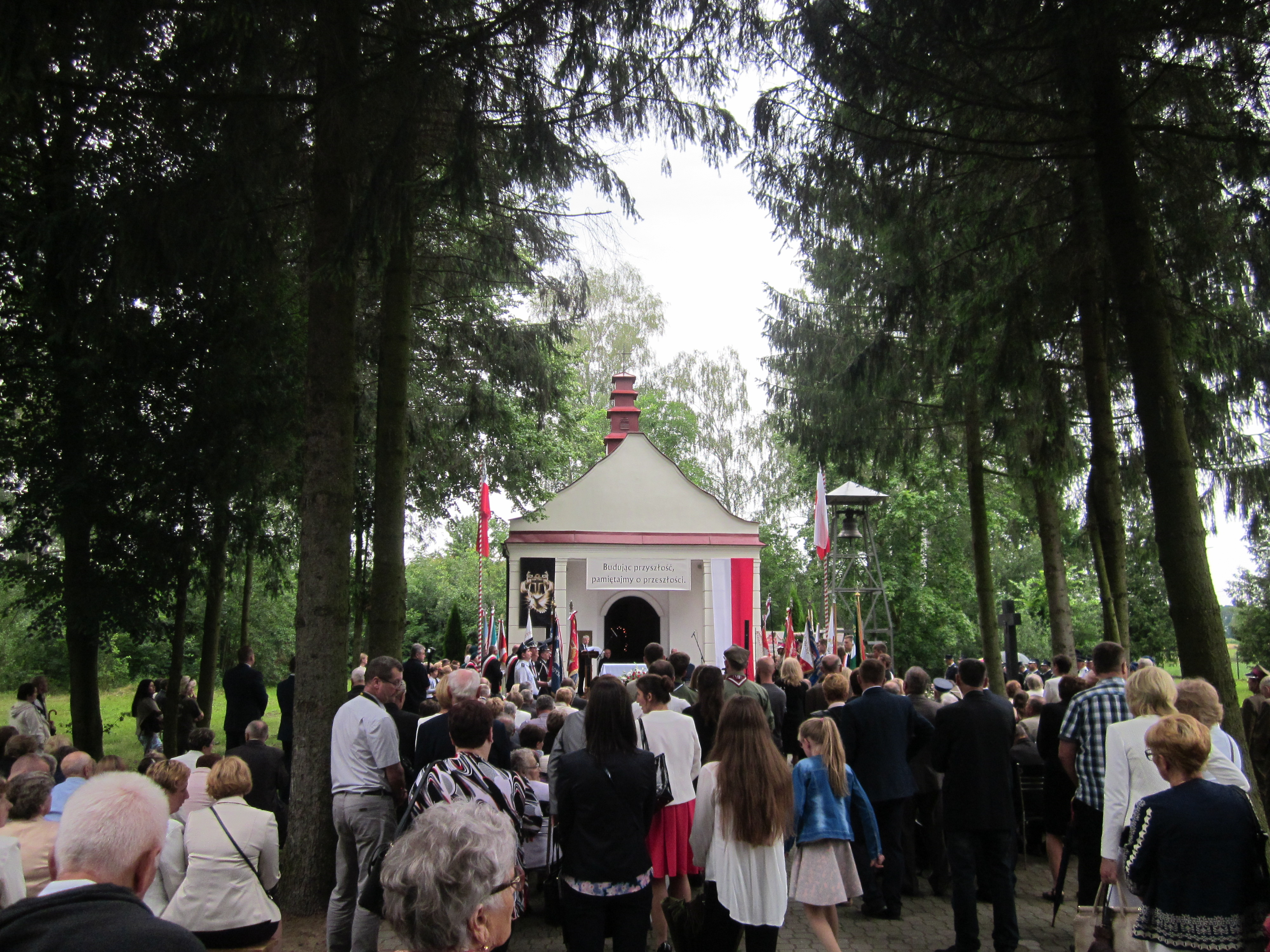
- Commemoration of the 73rd anniversary of massacre
- Location: 52°51′08″N 22°40′53″E; Krasowo-Częstki, Poland
- Date: 17 July 1943
- Target: Village inhabitants
- Attack type: War crime
- Deaths: 257
- Perpetrators: Ordnungspolizei, Schutzstaffel

The Krasowo-Częstki massacre was a Nazi war crime perpetrated by the Ordnungspolizei and SS in the village of Krasowo-Częstki within occupied Poland. On 17 July 1943, the village was completely burned; 257 of its inhabitants, mostly women and children, were murdered. The massacre was an act of retaliation against the civilian population, after at least eight Germans were killed in a skirmish with Polish partisans in the nearby colony of Kalnik. It was the bloodiest pacification action conducted by Nazi-German occupiers in those areas of prewar Białystok Voivodeship, which after Second World War remain within the borders of Poland.

== Prelude ==
Krasowo-Częstki is a village located approximately 19 kilometres (12 mi) from the town of Wysokie Mazowieckie in north-eastern Poland. Prior to the massacre, it had 70 households and 276 inhabitants. During the period of Nazi-German occupation of Poland, partisan units of the Home Army (Armia Krajowa, AK) were active in the nearby forests.

On 10 July 1943, a platoon of Kedyw of the Home Army led by 2nd Lieutenant Tadeusz Westfal, pseudonym Miś (Bear) (Note: From organizational point of view this platoon belonged to the Home Army Sub-district of Wysokie Mazowieckie.), gathered to conduct a raid against a German-operated dairy in Dąbrówka Kościelna. The partisans stayed overnight in the colony named Kalnik, which was a part of Krasowo-Częstki at that time. (Note: After the war, Kalnik became part of the Krasowo-Wólka. Therefore, some sources mistakenly indicate that the partisans stayed overnight in the latter village.) In the morning, Polish sentinels spotted numerous horse-drawn wagons filled with Germans. The reason why the Germans came to the colony remains unknown. According to some Polish sources, they were looking for the Krassowscy brothers, who had been freed by the partisans a few weeks earlier from arrest in Dąbrówka Kościelna. Other authors blame German informer Romuald Krassowski, who supposedly reported to the German authorities that partisans were present in Kalnik. On the other hand, in their reports, the local Home Army structures informed that the skirmish was the result of coincidence since the German expedition was returning from the nearby Łopień village, where they had arrested a dozen Poles.

The partisans made the decision to fight. According to the report signed by the commandant of the Białystok District of the Home Army, their intention was to free the men who had been arrested by the Germans in Łopień. However, other sources suggest that due to the lack of time for a safe retreat, they had no alternative but to engage in combat. In the ensuing skirmish, both sides suffered losses. According to the announcement later published by the occupying authorities, eight Germans were killed, including five "military men" and three gendarmes. Polish reports assessed the German losses at 11 or 13 deaths (including one Polish collaborator, a member of the Schutzmannschaft), with at least seven wounded. Additionally, two Polish coachmen were accidentally killed during the skirmish. The Kedyw platoon lost three killed in action and three lightly wounded. When German reinforcements arrived, the Polish unit retreated into the forests.

During that time, Father Józef Kaczyński, a Roman Catholic priest born in Krasowo-Częstki, served as a parochial vicar in Tykocin. He resided in the local parsonage, which also housed German officer Lieutenant Philipp Schweiger and his wife. Schweiger held the position of commander of the Gendarmerie unit in Tykocin. Despite the circumstances, the priest maintained a friendly relationship with the German couple. Additionally, in some private conversations, Schweiger expressed signs of aversion towards the Nazi regime. Three days after the skirmish in Kalnik, Schweiger approached Kaczyński and informed him that he had attended a conference in Białystok where the decision was made to pacify Krasowo-Częstki in retaliation for the recent German losses. With the assistance of Schweiger, who provided him with the necessary pass, Kaczyński went to Krasowo-Częstki to warn the residents. However, his warnings were met with disbelief. The villagers were convinced that German repressions might only target Kalnik, where the skirmish had occurred. Even Kaczyński's mother rejected his pleas and did not allow him to bring his siblings to Tykocin.

Additionally, a German individual who assumed control of the Mazury manor near Jabłoń Kościelna after the commencement of the Nazi occupation reportedly conveyed a suggestion to the local parish priest regarding potential consequences for the Polish population in response to the death of gendarmes. In response to this warning, the parish priest alerted the mayor of the Gmina Nowe Piekuty, Stanisław Olędzki, who subsequently sought refuge with his family within the parish premises.

== The massacre ==
=== Perpetrators ===
Some Polish historians believe that the pacification operation was personally overseen by the county commissar from Łomża, Karl von Groeben. According to witnesses, he was accompanied by a group that included the gmina commissar in Szepietowo – Thamm, Thamm's deputy Wilhelm Danke (or Danko), the commander of the Gendarmerie unit in Wysokie Mazowieckie – Lt. Goss, the commander of the Gendarmerie post in Wysokie Mazowieckie – Bittmann, the commander of the Gendarmerie post in Dąbrówka Kościelna and Szepietowo – Boeniger, and agricultural commissars in Szepietowo – Dubnitzky and Pohl. It is also suggested that the head of the Gestapo post in Łomża, SS-Obersturmführer E. K. Ennulat, may have been personally involved in the pacification.

Among the members of the punitive expedition were gendarmes from posts in Wysokie Mazowieckie, Dąbrówka Kościelna, Szepietów, Czyżew, and Nowe Piekuty. According to certain sources, they may have been accompanied by members of Feldgendarmerie from posts in Łomża and Wysokie Mazowieckie, as well as an unidentified Wehrmacht or SS unit. Jerzy Smurzyński suggests that this "SS unit" could have been Kommando "Müller", a special killing squad responsible for numerous executions and pacifications carried out in the Łomża region in July 1943.

=== The course of events ===
On 16 July, (Note: According to certain witnesses, in some villages, the directive to provide the wagons was issued only at dawn on 17 July. See: Kaczyński (2005), p. 98.) German gendarmes appeared in the villages neighboring Krasowo-Częstki and requested local sołtyses (village heads) to provide the German authorities with the horse-drawn wagons along with coachmen. The coachmen were then instructed to assemble in Krasowo-Częstki at dawn the following day.

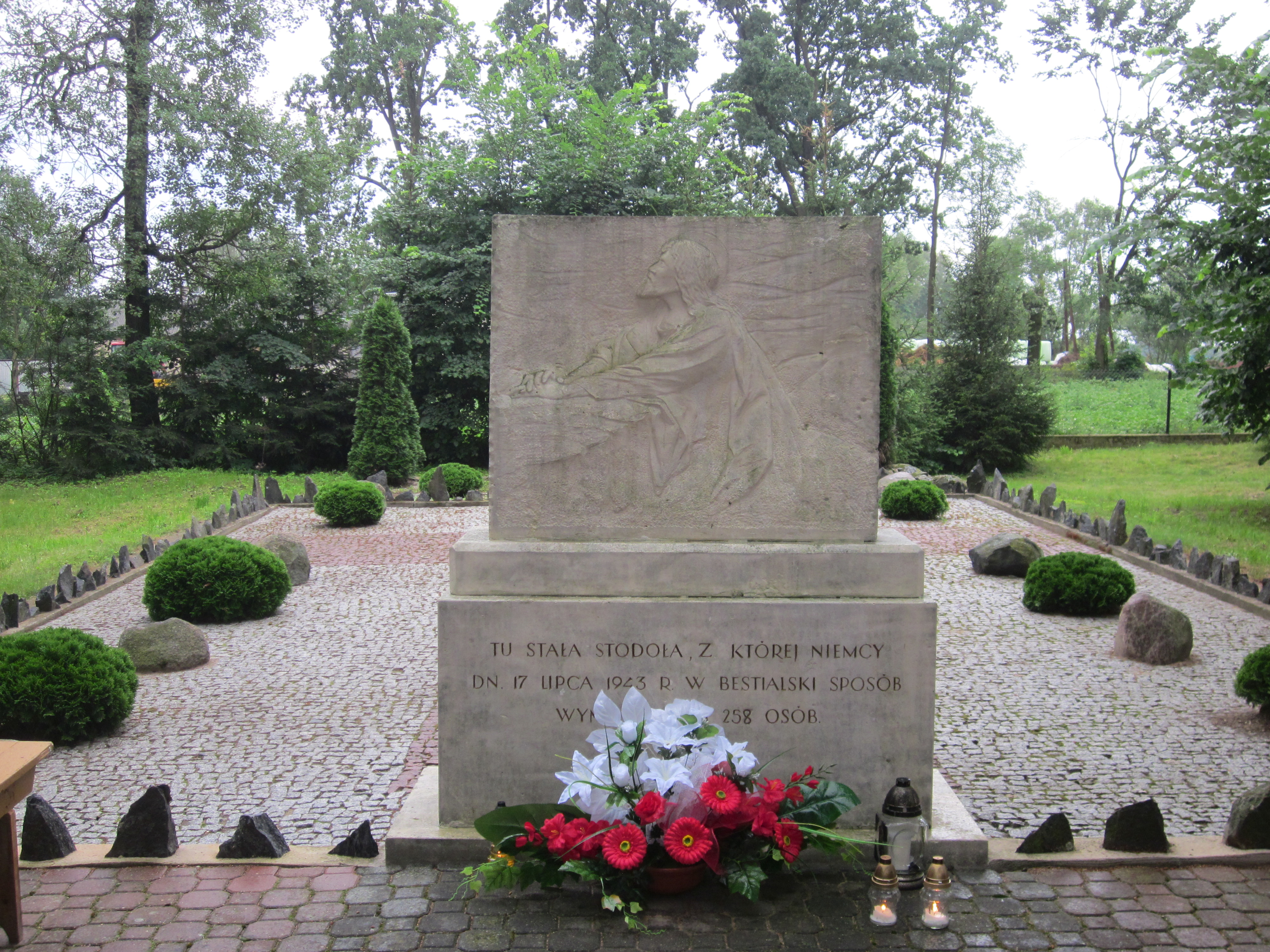
The place where Stanisław Jankowski's barn stood

The pacification operation commenced during the night of 16–17 July. Members of the punitive expedition arrived in the vicinity using cars and parked near Krasowo-Częstki. Subsequently, they formed a line and established a double or triple cordon around the village. The entry into Krasowo-Częstki occurred at dawn. Methodically, the Germans proceeded from house to house, compelling the inhabitants to gather along the road that traversed the village. (Note: According to Józef Fajkowski, the residents were gathered by the gendarmes and SS men in the square in front of the cross situated at the center of the village. It was at this location that they were notified of their death sentences, purportedly for their alleged support of the partisans. See: Fajkowski (1972), p. 240.) Before long, all detained Poles were directed to a barn belonging to Stanisław Janowski.

Within the barn, men and boys were segregated to the left corner, while women with small children were directed to the right corner. Everyone was instructed to lie face down on the ground. The Germans then began the process of verifying the identities of the detainees. The gendarmerie officer in charge of the operation permitted two young boys from Warsaw, who were employed by local farmers, to leave the village.

After some time, a group of approximately a dozen young men were compelled to exit the structure and dig two mass graves near the barn. Simultaneously, Polish men who had been brought from neighboring villages were ordered to transport livestock and movable property from the vacant farms to the headquarters of commissar Thamm in Szepietowo.

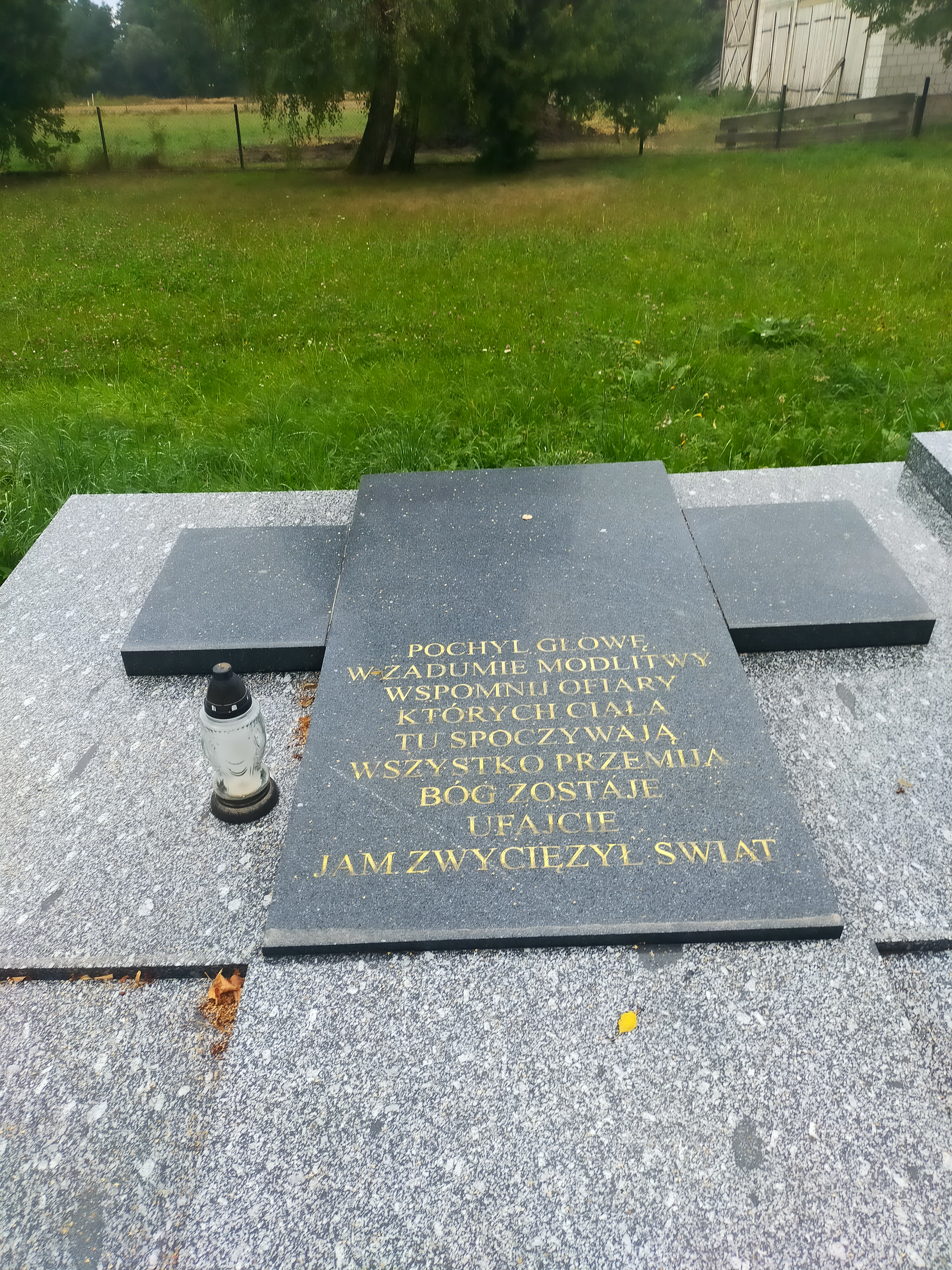
One of the two mass graves where the victims of the massacre were buried

The massacre began around noon. The initial victims were the men who had been assigned to dig the graves. The perpetrators murdered them by using hand grenades. The families gathered in the barn were called forth one by one according to a list, and their documents were seized before they were led to the edge of the graves, where they were shot in the back of the head. A coachman from a neighboring village, who witnessed the massacre, confirmed that those awaiting their inevitable fate in the barn sang the religious hymn "Sub tuum praesidium".

The bodies of men and boys were interred in one grave, while the bodies of women and children were placed in another. There were reports that some small children were thrown into the grave while still alive. According to witnesses, deputy commissar Danke purportedly tied a man named Mystkowski from the village of Pułazie-Świerże to his car and then dragged him behind the vehicle, whether he was alive or not. Simultaneously, the Germans began igniting the buildings, and a number of residents who had sought shelter there prior to the massacre perished in the flames.

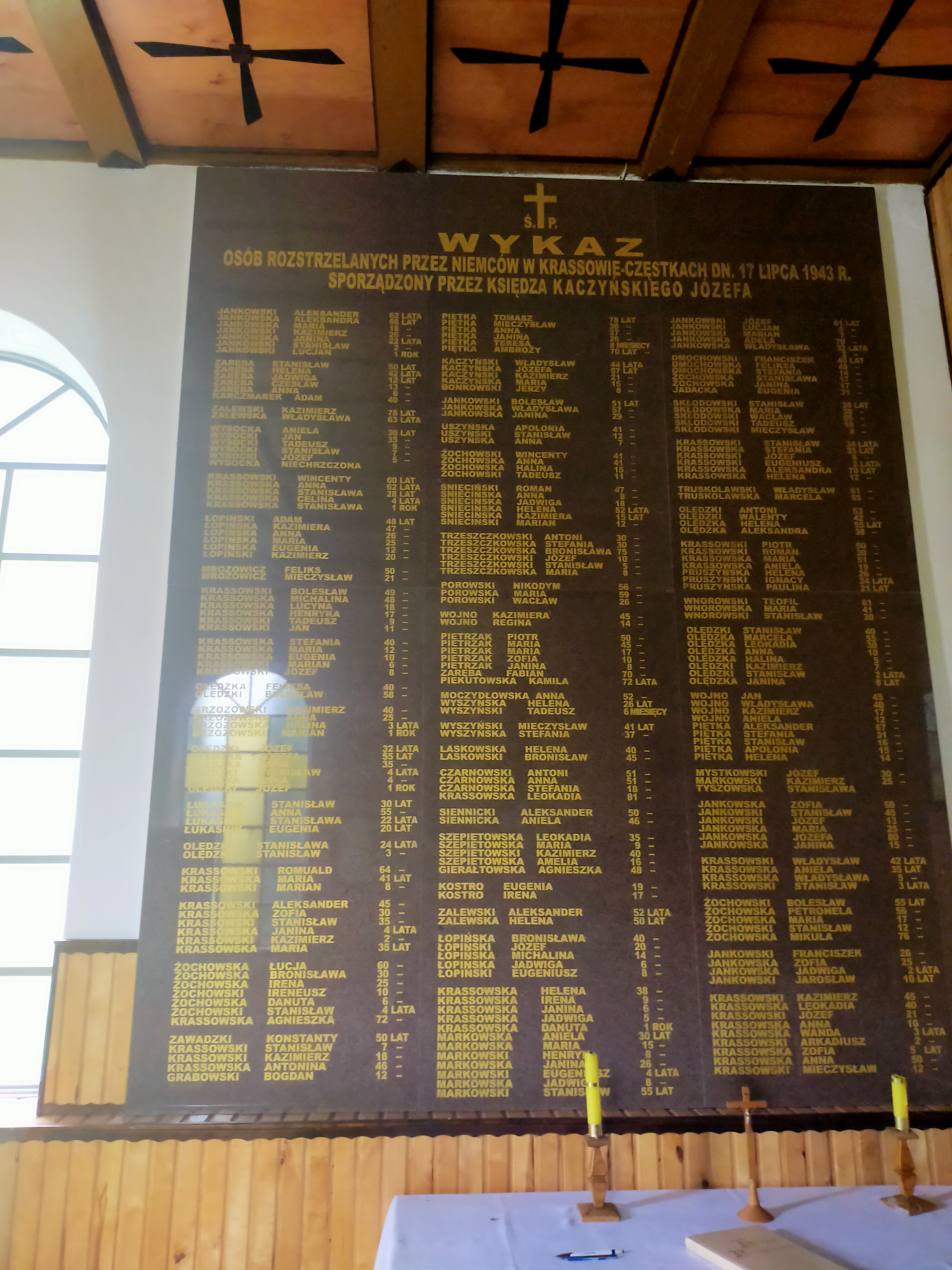
The names of the victims displayed inside the chapel-mausoleum

On that day, a total of 257 Poles lost their lives in Krasowo-Częstki. According to some sources, among the victims were 83 or 89 children under the age of 17, while Józef Fajkowski and Jan Religa assessed that 73 men, 97 women and 87 children were murdered during the massacre.

According to Jerzy Smurzyński, 35 individuals managed to survive the massacre. These survivors were those who successfully concealed themselves during the pacification, discreetly joined the coachmen from neighboring villages who were in the process of emptying farms, or happened to be outside the village on that day. Alternative sources estimate the number of survivors at either twelve or nineteen.

The authors of the study The villages of Białystok region accuse… assessed that 55 houses, 54 barns, and 60 cowsheds were razed during the pacification. Furthermore, the Germans appropriated livestock and movable property, which included 86 horses and 183 cows. However, Smurzyński, referring to the findings of Fr. Józef Kaczyński, provides slightly different statistics. According to this account, the Nazis destroyed 53 houses, 52 barns, and 62 cowsheds, and seized 85 horses, 178 cows, as well as an unspecified number of pigs and poultry. He also informs that only one farm, belonging to Kazimierz Krassowski, was spared from being set ablaze. Some of the plundered property was distributed among local ethnic Germans, and less valuable items were sold to the local non-German population.

According to some accounts, the Krasowo-Częstki massacre was the most severe pacification operation carried out by the Nazi occupiers in the rural areas of Białystok Voivodeship. In fact, it stands as the largest pacification conducted in the areas of Białystok Voivodeship that remained within Poland's borders after 1945. However, when considering the entire pre-war territory of the voivodeship, in terms of the number of victims, the Krasowo-Częstki massacre was surpassed by the pacification of the village of Szaulicze in Wołkowysk County (nowadays Šavuličy in Belarus), which recorded 366 victims.

== Aftermath ==
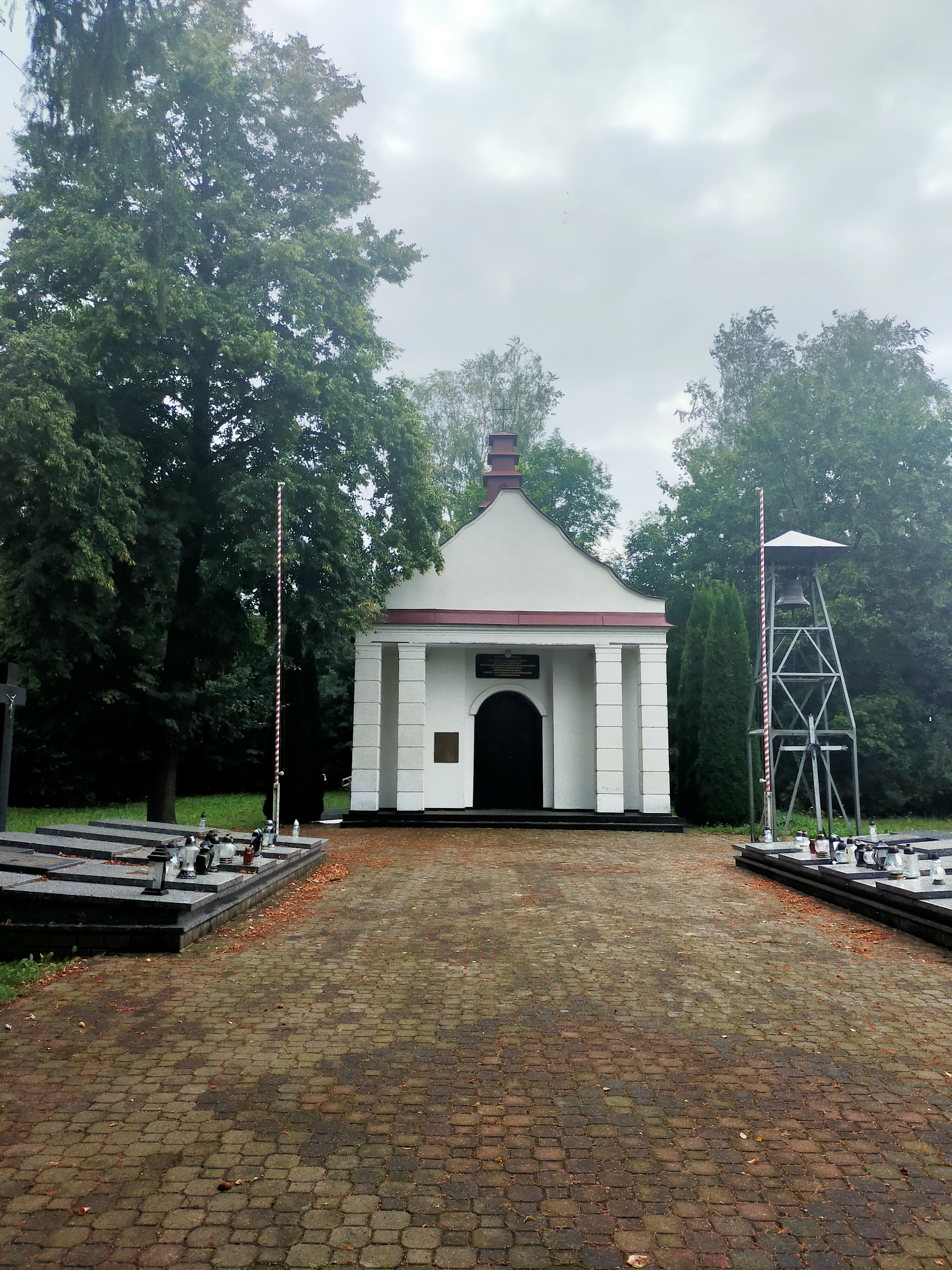
Chapel-mausoleum in Krasowo-Częstki

The Germans plowed the area where the village had previously stood. According to Józef Fajkowski, their intention was to establish a folwark there.

In response to the massacre, on 15 August 1943, a partisan unit of the Striking Cadre Battalions, recently merged with the Home Army and led by 2nd Lt. Stanisław Karolkiewicz, pseudonym Szczęsny, conducted a retaliatory attack on the village of Mittenheide and the Krummenheide forestry in East Prussia.

Following the war, the village underwent partial reconstruction. Shortly after the German occupation ended, the burial site of the victims was enclosed and marked with a birch cross. Fr. Józef Kaczyński, who lost his mother and three siblings during the pacification, made significant efforts to commemorate the events of July 1943. He and other survivors began compiling a list of victims shortly after the massacre. At the priest's initiative in 1946, a chapel-mausoleum was constructed in Krasowo-Częstki, placed near the location of the two mass graves. Inside the chapel, there are two plaques, one bearing the names of the victims and the other listing the survivors. An altar with a replica of the painting of Black Madonna of Częstochowa, as well as display cases containing fragments of burnt farm boards and photographs of the village and its inhabitants, many taken by Fr. Kaczyński shortly before the massacre, can be found within. Every year on 17 July, masses are held in remembrance of the victims.

In 1983, the "bell of reconciliation" was rung in the church of St. Kazimierz in Nowe Piekuty, the parish church for Krasowo-Częstki, where Fr. Kaczyński served after the war. The bell was funded by parishioners from Meckenheim, Germany, the hometown of the widow of Lt. Philipp Schweiger. (Note: Lieutenant Philipp Schweiger was killed by Home Army partisans in May 1944. See: Kaczyński (2005), p. 102.)

After 1960, records concerning the pacification of Krasowo-Częstki were transferred by the Chief Commission for Investigation of Hitlerite Crimes in Poland to the Central Office of the State Justice Administrations for the Investigation of National Socialist Crimes in Ludwigsburg. However, the perpetrators, like those responsible for many other war crimes committed in rural areas of occupied Poland, were never brought to justice. After the war, Karl von Groeben held a high position in the structures of the West German Federal Ministry of Displaced Persons, Refugees and War Victims.

The Polish documentary Czarny lipiec ("Black July") from 2001, directed by Agnieszka Arnold, narrates the story of the massacre in Krasowo-Częstki.

== Bibliography ==
- Dmitrów, Edmund (2002). "Oddziały operacyjne niemieckiej Policji Bezpieczeństwa i Służby Bezpieczeństwa a początek zagłady Żydów w Łomżyńskiem i na Białostocczyźnie latem 1941 roku" [Task forces of the German Security Police and Security Service and the beginning of the extermination of Jews in Łomża and the Białystok region in the summer of 1941]. In Machcewicz, Paweł; Persak, Krzysztof (eds.). Wokół Jedwabnego [On Jedwabne] (in Polish). Vol. 1: Studia. Warsaw: Instytut Pamięci Narodowej. ISBN 83-89078-08-2.
- Fajkowski, Józef (1972). Wieś w ogniu. Eksterminacja wsi polskiej w okresie okupacji hitlerowskiej [A countryside on fire. The extermination of the Polish villages during the Nazi occupation] (in Polish). Warszawa: Ludowa Spółdzielnia Wydawnicza.
- Fajkowski, Józef; Religa, Jan (1981). Zbrodnie hitlerowskie na wsi polskiej 1939–1945 [Nazi crimes in the Polish countryside 1939–1945] (in Polish). Warszawa: Książka i Wiedza.
- Gnatowski, Michał; Monkiewicz, Waldemar; Kowalczyk, Józef (1981). Wieś białostocka oskarża. Ze studiów nad eksterminacją wsi na Białostocczyźnie w latach wojny i okupacji hitlerowskiej [The villages of Białystok region accuse. From studies on the extermination of villages in the Białystok region during the war and Nazi occupation] (in Polish). Białystok: Okręgowa Komisja Badania Zbrodni Hitlerowskich and Ośrodek Badań Naukowych in Białystok. ISBN 83-00-00323-1.
- Jankowski, Andrzej (2009). "Wieś polska na ziemiach okupowanych przez Niemców w czasie II wojny światowej w postępowaniach karnych organów wymiaru sprawiedliwości Republiki Federalnej Niemiec" [Polish countryside in the area occupied by Nazis during World War II in the light of penal proceedings of justice administration bodies in the Federal Republic of Germany] (PDF). Studia Muzealno-Historyczne (in Polish). 1. ISSN 2080-2420.
- Kaczyński, Józef (2005). "Jak nie udało się uratować mieszkańców rodzinnej wsi" [How I couldn't save my home village]. Biuletyn IPN (in Polish). 12 (59). ISSN 1641-9561.
- Krajewski, Kazimierz; Łabuszewski, Tomasz (2006). "Białostockie – między różnymi sposobami widzenia historii" [Białystok region – between different ways of seeing history]. Biuletyn IPN (in Polish). 1–2 (60–61). ISSN 1641-9561.
- Laskowski, Jan, ed. (1985). Rejestr miejsc i faktów zbrodni popełnionych przez okupanta hitlerowskiego na ziemiach polskich w latach 1939–1945. Województwo łomżyńskie [Register of places and facts of crimes committed by the Nazi Occupier on Polish Lands in the years 1939–1945. Łomża Voivodeship] (in Polish). Warszawa: GKBZHwP-IPN.
- Markiewicz, Marcin (2003–2004). "Represje hitlerowskie wobec wsi białostockiej" [Nazi repressions against the villages in Białystok region]. Biuletyn IPN (in Polish). 12–1 (35–36). ISSN 1641-9561.
- Monkiewicz, Waldemar; Kowalczyk, Józef (1986). Bez przedawnienia. Pacyfikacje wsi białostockich w latach 1939, 1941–1944 [Without the statute of limitations. Pacification of Białystok region’s villages in the years 1939, 1941–1944] (in Polish). Białystok: Krajowa Agencja Wydawnicza. ISBN 83-03-01263-0.
- Olędzka, Marzena; Mantur, Katarzyna; Niemyjska, Dorota (2014). Pamięć niezasypana w popiołach: Krasowo Częstki, Jabłoń Dobki, Skłody Borowe [Memory which has not been buried in ashes: Krasowo Częstki, Jabłoń Dobki, Skłody Borowe] (in Polish). Nowe Piekuty: Urząd Gminy Nowe Piekuty. ISBN 978-83-928830-1-2.
- Smurzyński, Jerzy (1997). Czarne lata na łomżyńskiej ziemi. Masowe zbrodnie hitlerowskie w roku 1939 i latach 1941–1945 w świetle dokumentów [Dark years on the land of Łomża. Mass Nazi crimes in 1939 and 1941–1945 in the light of documents] (in Polish). Łomża: Towarzystwo Przyjaciół Ziemi Łomżyńskiej. ISBN 83-902985-2-X.
