= Jabłoń-Dobki massacre =

- Part of Occupation of Poland (1939–1945)
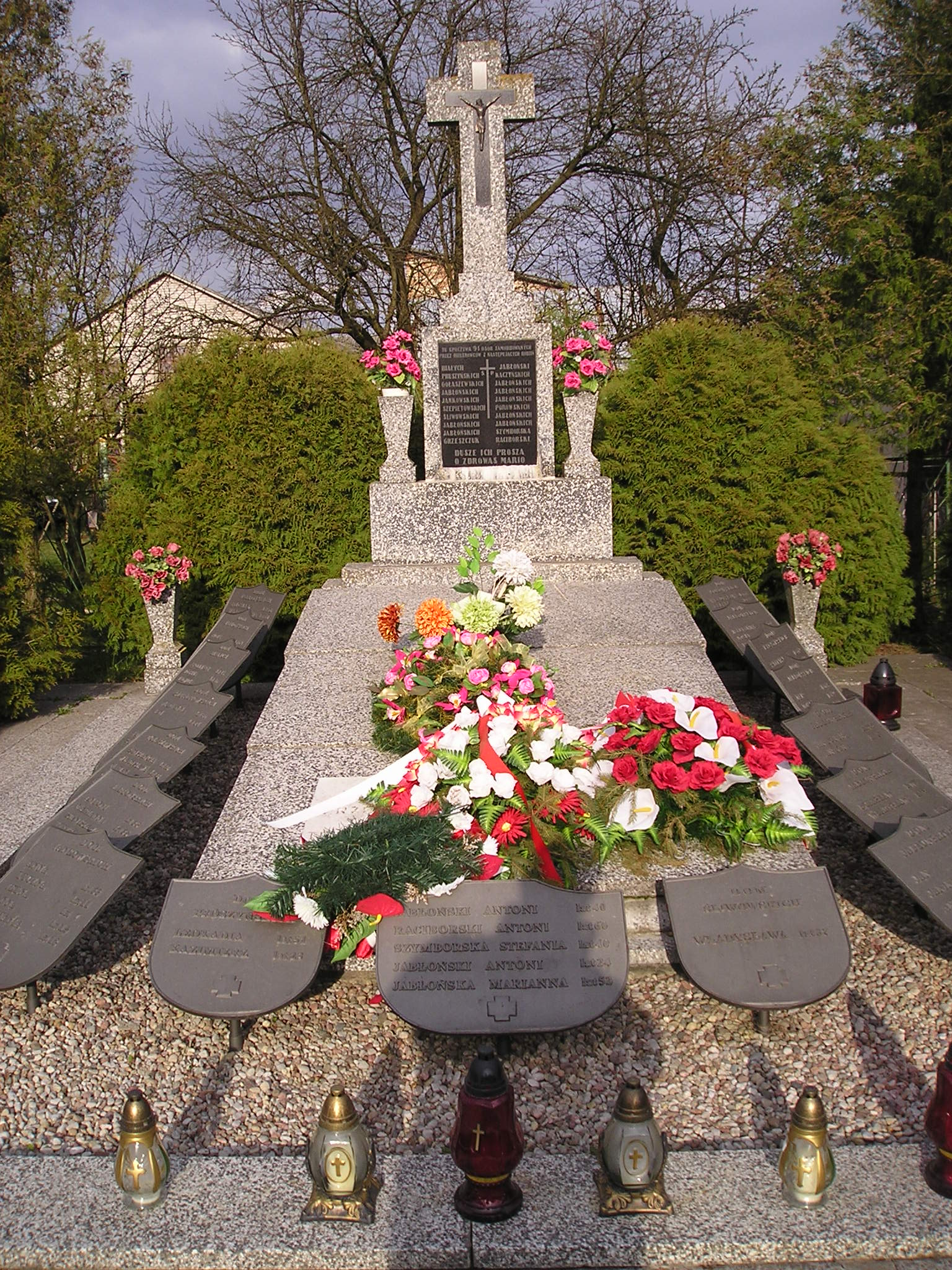
- A mass grave in which the victims of the massacre were buried
- Location: Jabłoń-Dobki, Poland
- Date: March 8, 1944
- Target: Village inhabitants
- Attack type: War crime
- Deaths: 91–93
- Perpetrators: Ordnungspolizei, Wehrmacht

The Jabłoń-Dobki massacre was a Nazi war crime perpetrated by the Ordnungspolizei and Wehrmacht in the village of Jabłoń-Dobki within occupied Poland. On March 8, 1944, the village faced complete destruction, with an estimated 91 to 93 of its inhabitants, predominantly women and children, losing their lives. A significant number of victims were burned alive. This massacre served as a form of retaliation against the civilian population following the killing of a German gendarme during an earlier skirmish with Polish partisans in Jabłoń-Dobki earlier on the same day.

== Prelude ==
Jabłoń-Dobki is situated approximately 8 km (5.0 mi) from the city of Wysokie Mazowieckie in north-eastern Poland. During the Nazi-German occupation of Poland, it comprised 18 farms and housed over 100 inhabitants. The local populace actively supported Polish partisans, hosting an outpost of the Home Army (Armia Krajowa, AK) within the village.

On March 7, 1944, an eight-person Home Army patrol came to Jabłoń-Dobki and stayed there overnight. Wehrmacht soldiers from the neighboring village of Jabłoń Kościelna spotted the partisans. The following morning, a gendarmerie unit from Wysokie Mazowieckie arrived in the village, leading to a confrontation. During the skirmish, gendarme Zygmunt Klosser, locally known as "Bloody Zygmunt," was killed, while several other Germans sustained injuries. (Note: Some sources indicate that during the skirmish, one gendarme was killed, another was wounded, and one was disarmed by the partisans. See: Gnatowski, Monkiewicz, Kowalczyk (1981), p. 91, also Fajkowski (1972), p. 307.) The gendarmes swiftly retreated from Jabłoń-Dobki, prompting the Home Army partisans to also begin their withdrawal.

== The massacre ==
On the same day, the Nazis initiated the pacification of the village, forming a punitive force comprising gendarmes from posts in Wysokie Mazowieckie, Szepietowo, and Czyżew, alongside Wehrmacht soldiers from Jabłoń Kościelna. The operation was supervised by several officials from the German occupational authorities in Wysokie Mazowieckie, including gmina commissar Otto Erit, agricultural commissar Neuman, gendarmerie post commandant Bittman, and gendarmerie lieutenant Gos.

The Germans encircled Jabłoń-Dobki, establishing a tight perimeter around the village. They systematically searched farms, forcing inhabitants outdoors. During this phase of the punitive action, up to a dozen residents were immediately shot, including those attempting to flee.

The detained Poles were herded onto Stanisław Szepietowski's property, the site of gendarme Klosser's earlier death. They were confined within a farm building, (Note: The sources offer conflicting details regarding the structure—some refer to it as a pigsty, while others describe it as a barn.) which was later set ablaze and bombarded with grenades. Roughly 80 men, women, and children perished in flames. Ultimately, the Germans ransacked the abandoned farms and ignited the buildings.

According to Jerzy Smurzyński, 93 individuals were killed in Jabłoń-Dobki that day, including 33 women and 30 children under 15 years old. The youngest victim was 6 months old, while the oldest was 82. Among those murdered were 82 inhabitants of the pacified village, and 11 individuals from neighboring areas present in Jabłoń-Dobki that day (Buczyno, Gierałty, Mystki-Rzym, Jabłoń-Markowięta, Jabłoń-Zambrowizna, Wyliny-Ruś, Szymbory-Włodki, Warsaw). Smurzyński notes that 22 residents survived the massacre (seventeen escaped, and five were elsewhere that day).

The Register of places and facts of crimes committed by the Nazi Occupier on Polish Lands in 1939–1945 reports 91 fatalities during the pacification, including 31 women and 30 children under 15. According to this source, 82 victims were from Jabłoń-Dobki, with nine from neighboring villages. Other sources estimate the number of victims at 91, 92, or 96 individuals.

The pacification resulted in the destruction of 17 residential homes and 48 farm buildings, sparing only three farms situated on the village outskirts. The perpetrators seized 42 horses, 107 cows, and 145 pigs.

== Aftermath ==
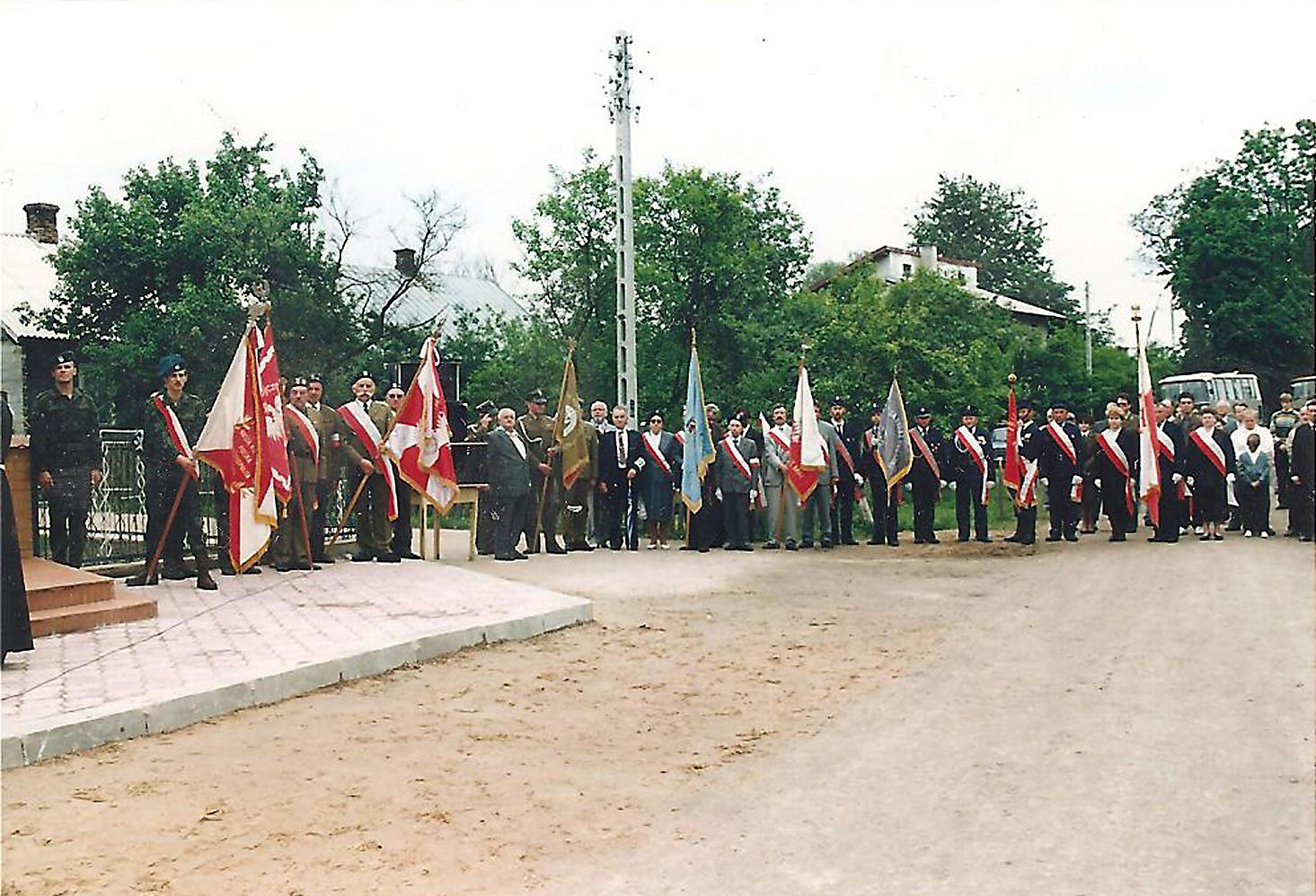
60th anniversary of massacre

The victims of the massacre were interred in a communal grave. Following the war, the village was reconstructed. A chapel was erected on the site where the farm building, where the villagers were burned, once stood. A tombstone and a cross were placed to mark the mass grave.

After 1960, records concerning the pacification of Jabłoń-Dobki were transferred by the Chief Commission for Investigation of Hitlerite Crimes in Poland to the Central Office of the State Justice Administrations for the Investigation of National Socialist Crimes in Ludwigsburg. However, the perpetrators, like those responsible for many other war crimes committed in rural areas of occupied Poland, were never brought to justice.

== Bibliography ==
- Fajkowski, Józef (1972). Wieś w ogniu. Eksterminacja wsi polskiej w okresie okupacji hitlerowskiej [A countryside on fire. The extermination of the Polish villages during the Nazi occupation] (in Polish). Warszawa: Ludowa Spółdzielnia Wydawnicza.
- Fajkowski, Józef; Religa, Jan (1981). Zbrodnie hitlerowskie na wsi polskiej 1939–1945 [Nazi crimes in the Polish countryside 1939–1945] (in Polish). Warszawa: Książka i Wiedza.
- Gnatowski, Michał; Monkiewicz, Waldemar; Kowalczyk, Józef (1981). Wieś białostocka oskarża. Ze studiów nad eksterminacją wsi na Białostocczyźnie w latach wojny i okupacji hitlerowskiej [The villages of Białystok region accuse. From studies on the extermination of villages in the Białystok region during the war and Nazi occupation] (in Polish). Białystok: Okręgowa Komisja Badania Zbrodni Hitlerowskich and Ośrodek Badań Naukowych in Białystok. ISBN 83-00-00323-1.
- Jankowski, Andrzej (2009). "Wieś polska na ziemiach okupowanych przez Niemców w czasie II wojny światowej w postępowaniach karnych organów wymiaru sprawiedliwości Republiki Federalnej Niemiec" [Polish countryside in the area occupied by Nazis during World War II in the light of penal proceedings of justice administration bodies in the Federal Republic of Germany] (PDF). Studia Muzealno-Historyczne (in Polish). 1. ISSN 2080-2420.
- Laskowski, Jan, ed. (1985). Rejestr miejsc i faktów zbrodni popełnionych przez okupanta hitlerowskiego na ziemiach polskich w latach 1939–1945. Województwo łomżyńskie [Register of places and facts of crimes committed by the Nazi Occupier on Polish Lands in the years 1939–1945. Łomża Voivodeship] (in Polish). Warszawa: GKBZHwP-IPN.
- Madajczyk, Czesław (1965). Hitlerowski terror na wsi polskiej 1939–1945. Zestawienie większych akcji represyjnych [Nazi terror in the Polish countryside 1939–1945. List of major repressive actions] (in Polish). Warszawa: Państwowe Wydawnictwo Naukowe.
- Markiewicz, Marcin (2003–2004). "Represje hitlerowskie wobec wsi białostockiej" [Nazi repressions against the villages in Białystok region]. Biuletyn IPN (in Polish). 12–1 (35–36). ISSN 1641-9561.
- Smurzyński, Jerzy (1997). Czarne lata na łomżyńskiej ziemi. Masowe zbrodnie hitlerowskie w roku 1939 i latach 1941–1945 w świetle dokumentów [Dark years on the land of Łomża. Mass Nazi crimes in 1939 and 1941–1945 in the light of documents] (in Polish). Łomża: Towarzystwo Przyjaciół Ziemi Łomżyńskiej. ISBN 83-902985-2-X.
