= Stokowisko =

- Village
- Location within Poland
- Coordinates: 52°53′55″N 22°42′42″E
- Country: Poland
- Voivodeship: Podlaskie
- County: Wysokie Mazowieckie
- Gmina: Nowe Piekuty
- Population: 95
- Postal code: 18-212
- Car plates: BWM

Stokowisko [stɔkɔˈviskɔ] is a village in the administrative district of Gmina Nowe Piekuty, within Wysokie Mazowieckie County, Podlaskie Voivodeship, in north-eastern Poland.

From 1975 to 1998, the village belonged administratively to Łomża Voivideship.

The faithful of the Roman Catholic Church belong to St. Casimir Parish in Nowe Piekuty.

== History ==
In 1688, part of Stokowiska was owned by Wiktoryn Kuczyński (formerly Walenty Kuczyński). In the Glinka archival file, a document from 1701 mentions Kotuński from Stokowisko.

In the 19th century it was documented that a village and a manor in the Wysokie Mazowieckie County, Poświętne municipality and parish. Near the village there were limestone deposits and a windmill.

At the end of the 19th century, the estate was owned by Tomasz Kryński, who built a wooden manor house and brick outbuildings. He established a manor park, three ponds and a fountain. Avenues and access roads were also laid out.

Around 1910, the three-hundred-hectare (740-acre) Stokowisko estate was bought by Vincent Jaźwiński who came from the village of Jaźwiny-Koczoty near Czyżew. He was assisted in running the farm by his son Thaddeus.

In 1921, Stokowisko village had five houses and thirty-four inhabitants, while the manor had seven houses and 102 inhabitants. Eleven of those inhabitants were Eastern Orthodox Christians.

At the start of World War Two the Soviets invaded in 1939 and set up a sovkhoz. NKVD troops were stationed here for some time. The Soviets were forced out in June 1941 by the Germans in Operation Barbarossa. The estate was managed by Edward Ekielski; Thaddeus Jaźwiński's brother-in-law and Ekielski managed it until the summer of 1944.

After the Second World War, the Stokowisko estate was parcelled out. For some time the village was the seat of the Gromadzka Rada Narodowa.

From September 1955, a primary school, relocated from Łopieni-Zyski to the village. It was located on the former manor house premises. Construction of a new building was also started, with the support of local people, the school was completed in October 1959. Teaching was carried out at the level of grades I-VII and later I-VIII. The school functioned until the end of August 2003. By Resolution No. VII/26/03 of the Nowe Piekuty Municipality Council and on the 27 March 2003, the school was abolished.

In 2008, Stokowisko numbered twenty-three houses with 108 inhabitants.

== Places of interest ==
In the Nowe Piekuty municipality where Stokowisko is located, there are twelve historic buildings included in the register of monuments of the Podlaskie Voivodeship. One of these is the World War I war cemetery in Stokowisko.

Other historical sites are:

- Wooden manor house and brick-built farm buildings
- Wooden houses dating from the early 20th century
