= Skłody =

Skłody is a Polish placename. It may refer to:

- Niemyje-Skłody
- Skłody Borowe
- Skłody-Piotrowice
- Skłody-Przyrusy
- Skłody Średnie
- Skłody-Stachy

== See also ==
- Skłóty
