= Pruszanka Mała =

- Village
- Location within Poland
- Coordinates: 52°53′04″N 22°40′11″E
- Country: Poland
- Voivodeship: Podlaskie
- County: Wysokie Mazowieckie
- Gmina: Nowe Piekuty

Pruszanka Mała [pruˈʂaŋka ˈmawa] is a village in the administrative district of Gmina Nowe Piekuty, within Wysokie Mazowieckie County, Podlaskie Voivodeship, in north-eastern Poland.
