= Stare Żochy =

- Village
- Coat of arms

- Location within Poland
- Coordinates: 52°50′01″N 22°40′07″E
- Country: Poland
- Voivodeship: Podlaskie
- County: Wysokie Mazowieckie
- Gmina: Nowe Piekuty

Stare Żochy [ˈstarɛ ˈʐɔxɨ] is a village in the administrative district of Gmina Nowe Piekuty, within Wysokie Mazowieckie County, Podlaskie Voivodeship, in north-eastern Poland.
