= Łopienie-Jeże =

- Village
- Location within Poland
- Coordinates: 52°52′34″N 22°43′36″E
- Country: Poland
- Voivodeship: Podlaskie
- County: Wysokie Mazowieckie
- Gmina: Nowe Piekuty

Łopienie-Jeże [wɔˈpjɛɲɛ ˈjɛʐɛ] is a village in the administrative district of Gmina Nowe Piekuty, within Wysokie Mazowieckie County, Podlaskie Voivodeship, in north-eastern Poland.
