= Tłoczewo =

- Village
- Location within Poland
- Coordinates: 52°53′N 22°40′E
- Country: Poland
- Voivodeship: Podlaskie
- County: Wysokie Mazowieckie
- Gmina: Nowe Piekuty

Tłoczewo [twɔˈt͡ʂɛvɔ] is a village in the administrative district of Gmina Nowe Piekuty, within Wysokie Mazowieckie County, Podlaskie Voivodeship, in north-eastern Poland.
