= Raid on Mittenheide =

Partisan action during World War II

Coordinates: 53°31′00″N 21°35′54″E

In mid-August 1943, a Polish unit of the Striking Cadre Battalions (UBK), which was controlled by the resistance organization Confederation of the Nation, launched an armed attack on East Prussian villages in the area of Johannisburg (now: Pisz). The attack, ordered by Colonel Stanislaw Karolkiewicz, was launched in revenge for atrocities which the Germans committed against the Polish population of the Bialystok District. The targets of the attack included devout Nazis, NSDAP members and ethnic German inhabitants of the district who were engaging in brutality against the Polish population of the district. According to Polish sources, some 70 Germans were killed and 40 German farms were razed to the ground, while an eyewitness reported that 13 people were killed, including a woman and two children, and two people were wounded. The revenge attack shocked Prussian Germans and it also caused them to rethink the genocidal tactics which they used against the Polish population.

== Background ==
=== Under Soviet Occupation ===
Following Nazi and Soviet aggression on Poland in September 1939, the Second Polish Republic was divided by the two allied powers under the terms of the Molotov–Ribbentrop Pact. The area of Białystok became part of the Byelorussian Soviet Socialist Republic, and was annexed by the Soviet Union. Thousands ethnic Poles, and also Belarusians and Jews, were forcibly deported to Siberia. Among the deported Poles were civil servants, judges, police officers, professional army officers, factory owners, landlords, political activists, leaders of cultural, educational and religious organisations, and others activists in the community. All of them were dubbed enemies of the people.

Polish resistance against the Soviets in the area of Białystok (especially along the swampy Biebrza river) began immediately after the September Campaign and in mid-1940 there were conspirational organizations in 161 towns and villages in the future area of Bialystok District. Skirmishes with the NKVD were common, mostly around Jedwabne, where the anti-Soviet feelings were the strongest.

=== Under Nazi Occupation ===
During the Nazi occupation, German terror in Białystok District worsened and most atrocities on civilian population were committed by German units and police from neighboring East Prussia.

On July 17, 1943, the Germans killed all 257 inhabitants of the village of Krasowo-Częstki, near Wysokie Mazowieckie (including 83 under seventeen years of age), ransacked their belongings and burned the village. In the following days several other massacres were committed: in the village of Sikory-Tomkowięta, German SS Kommando Mueller killed 49 people, in Zawada and Laskowce, 58 persons were killed, in Grzedy - 36, in Wnory-Wandy - 32. Altogether, in July 1943 alone, the Germans killed around 800 civilians in the western part of Bialystok District. Polish resistance fighters decided to take revenge on the Germans.

== The attack ==
In July 1943 Colonel Stanisław Karolkiewicz (nom de guerre Szczęsny) organized a unit of the Striking Cadre Battalions, which was part of the right-wing Confederation of the Nation. Its members chose their noms de guerre from characters of Pan Tadeusz, an epic poem by Adam Mickiewicz. Since the Striking Cadre Battalions' headquarters permitted retaliatory attacks, the Poles decided to make a raid on East Prussia, in the area of Johannisburg. The choice was not accidental - many German soldiers and administration workers in Bialystok District came from that part of the Third Reich. There, they lived their families, and there, the Germans felt safe.

Colonel Stanislaw Karolkiewicz and his unit of 28 well-armed men, avoiding German troops, started off from the Wysokie Mazowieckie County. They crossed the Narew and the Biebrza, reaching the northern part of the Łomża County. Karolkiewicz and his men were closely cooperating with local structures of the National Armed Forces, which was a dominant underground organization in this part of occupied Poland and whose members provided Karolkiewicz with vital information about the Prussian side of the border.

Karolkiewicz decided that the Poles would attack the village of Mittenheide and the forestership of Krummenheide. Mittenheide (until 1938 Turoscheln, today Turośl), located 3 km north of the pre-war border. According to Kazimierz Krajewski, in 1943 the village was an armed settlement (each house was armed and the men were organised in the paramilitary Landwache formation) of 1,000 people and an unknown number of escapees from western German cities, who had fled from Allied bombing. According to official German statistics the village had 519 permanent inhabitants in 1939. A police station was also located in the village. Among the residents of Mittenheide, there was SA Standartenführer Herman Upitz (or Herbert Opitz), a special envoy of Heinrich Himmler delegated to fight against Polish existence in the area, known for his hostile attitude towards Polish and Russian slave workers. Other targets included houses of devoted Nazis, members of the Nazi party and inhabitants that engaged in brutality against Polish population

The objectives of the attack were:

- to destroy the police station,
- to destroy households of Nazi party members and those Germans who participated in massacres of Poles,
- to kill Herman Upitz.

Karolkiewicz and his men, supported by a patrol of the National Armed Forces under Antoni Zdunczyk “Olowek” (seven soldiers) crossed the border on August 14, 1943, at 22:00 hours. The date of the attack - August 15, was chosen deliberately, as this is the official day of the Polish Army, to commemorate the Miracle at the Vistula.

After reaching Mittenheide, the Poles split into five groups and cut off telephone lines. The attack began before midnight on the solitary Forester's house of Herbert Opitz. Opitz, Mittenheide's Forester, his wife, 6-year-old daughter and 2-year-old son were killed. The partisans captured several weapons inside the Forester's Office, a car and a motorcycle. Then they entered the village to attack the police station, facing tough resistance from the Germans. Within around two hours, some 40 German households were destroyed, 69 civilians and 3 policemen, as well as Upitz, were killed.

In contradiction to these numbers, an eyewitness, Irma Bartlick, reports that apart from the Opitz family, 7 additional persons were immediately killed and 4 wounded, of which 2 died later on. In total 13 people lost their lives. Some of the victims were killed by the Ostarbeiter, who used the raid to take their revenge. The Poles deliberately spared the house of Hildegard Cramer von Laue, a widow, whose husband, a Wehrmacht officer, died on the Eastern Front. She was known for her humane attitude towards the Poles and Karolkiewicz himself talked to her that night, explaining the reasons for the attack. The raid ended at 2 AM, after Karolkiewicz fired a green flare. The Poles escaped to the nearby Pisz forest, together with their booty - a submachine gun, 30 carbines, 14 pistols, a large quantity of ammunition as well as uniforms and boots. Parts of the equipment was later handed to the local units of the Home Army and the National Armed Forces. Also, together with Karolkiewicz's men, five Ostarbeiters fled - four Poles and one Lithuanian. Polish losses were minimal.

== The aftermath ==
This raid was a shock to the local community. Its echoes reached Berlin and Heinrich Himmler himself was vividly interested in the investigation, which was carried out by the police authorities from Allenstein. However, nobody was caught and the unit, after hiding for three days in the forest, left East Prussia, heading towards Novogrudok..

On May 3, 2006 Stanislaw Karolkiewicz was posthumously promoted to Brigade General, by President Lech Kaczyński.

== See also ==
- Military history of Poland during World War II
