= Krasowo-Wólka =

- Village
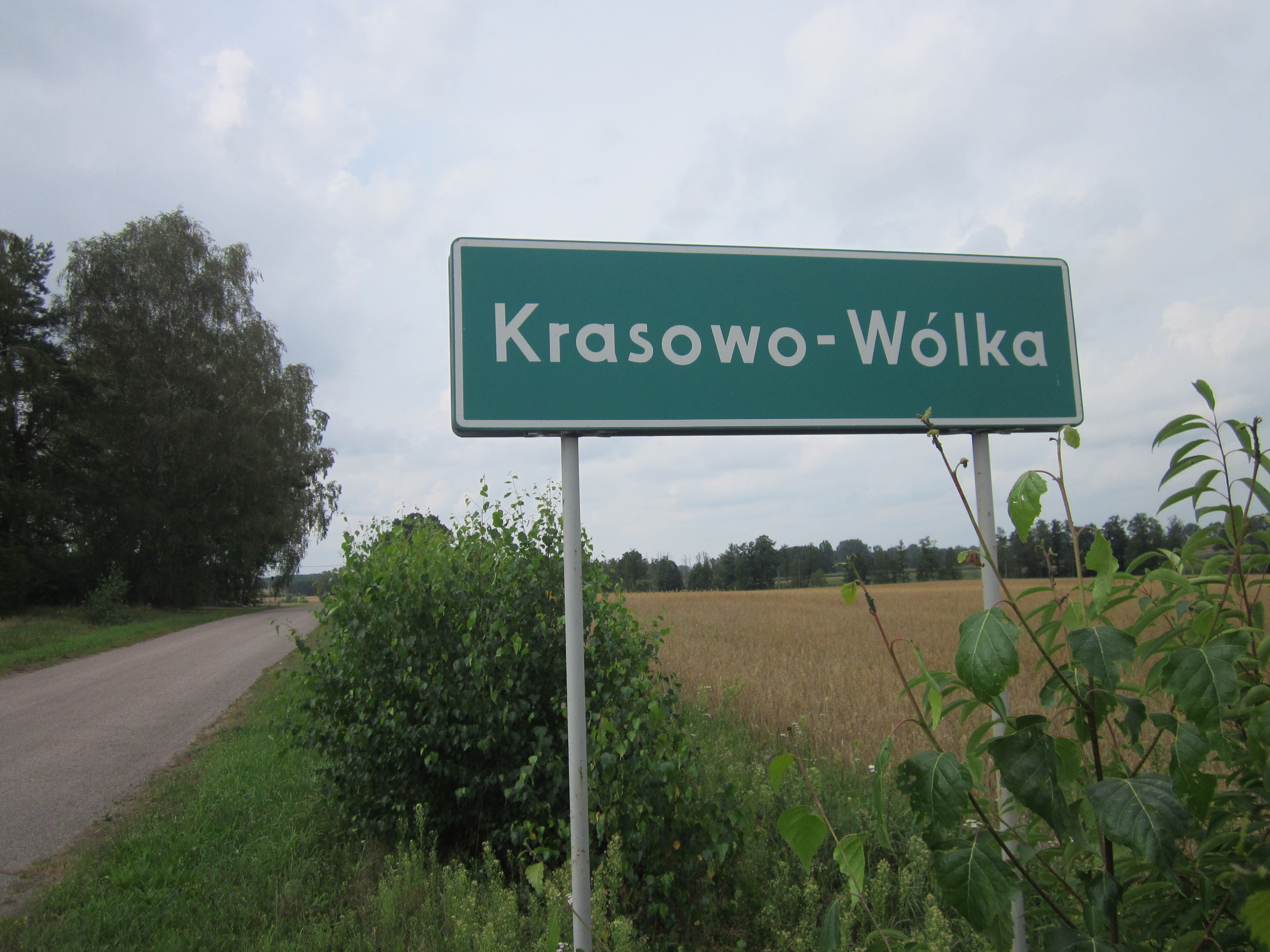
- Road sign in Krasowo-Wólka

- Location within Poland
- Coordinates: 52°52′18″N 22°37′59″E
- Country: Poland
- Voivodeship: Podlaskie
- County: Wysokie Mazowieckie
- Gmina: Nowe Piekuty

Krasowo-Wólka [kraˈsɔvɔ ˈvulka] is a village in the administrative district of Gmina Nowe Piekuty, within Wysokie Mazowieckie County, Podlaskie Voivodeship, in north-eastern Poland.
