= Jabłoń-Dąbrowa =

- Village
- Location within Poland
- Coordinates: 52°54′42″N 22°41′55″E
- Country: Poland
- Voivodeship: Podlaskie
- County: Wysokie Mazowieckie
- Gmina: Nowe Piekuty
- Elevation: 165 m (541 ft)
- Population: 4,736

Jabłoń-Dąbrowa [ˈjabwɔɲ dɔmˈbrɔva] is a village in the administrative district of Gmina Nowe Piekuty, within Wysokie Mazowieckie County, Podlaskie Voivodeship, in north-eastern Poland.
