= Krasowo-Częstki =

- Village
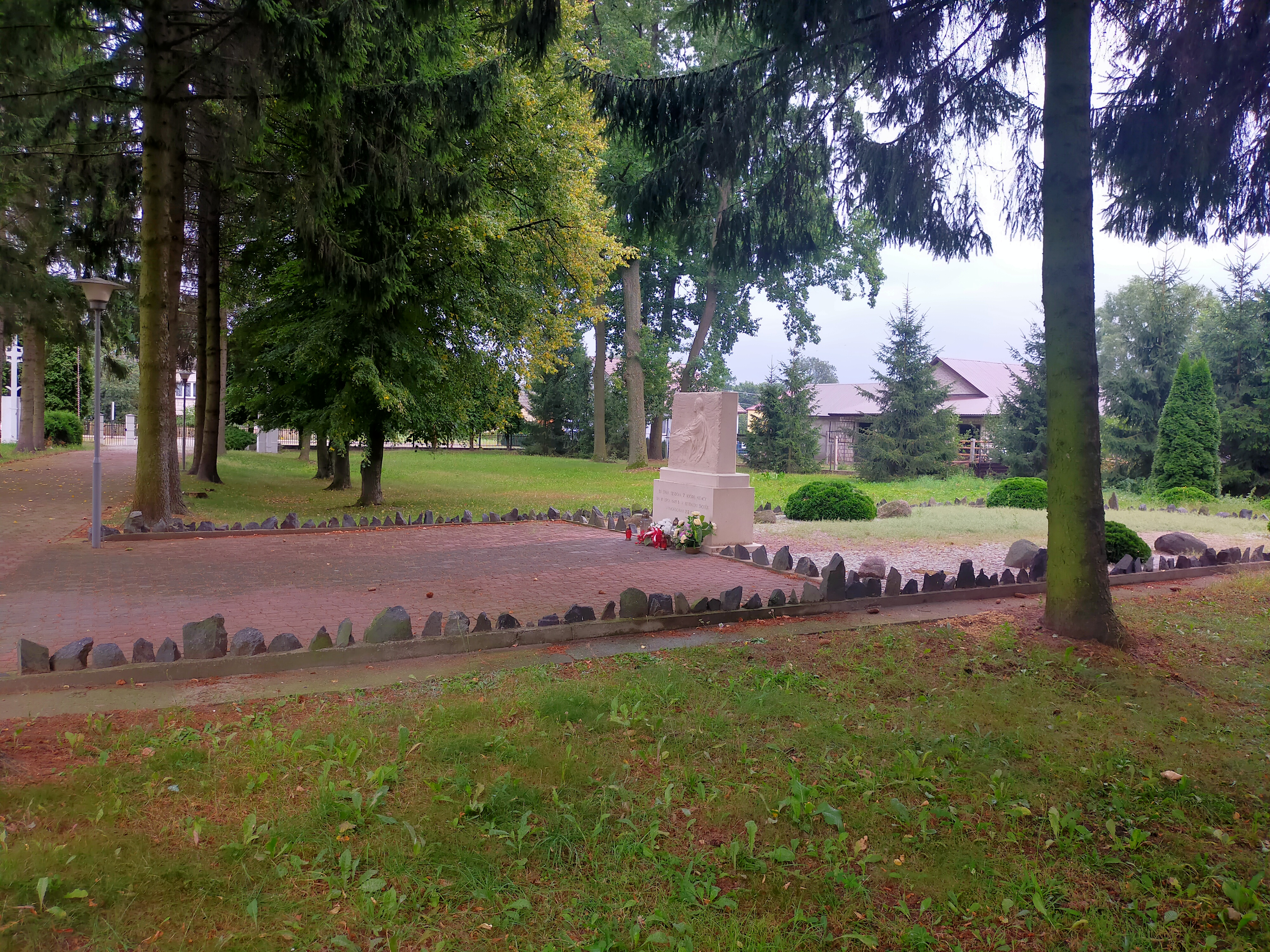
- Memorial at the scene of the German massacre of 257 Poles

- Location within Poland
- Coordinates: 52°51′10″N 22°40′53″E
- Country: Poland
- Voivodeship: Podlaskie
- County: Wysokie Mazowieckie
- Gmina: Nowe Piekuty
- Time zone: UTC+1 (CET)
  - Summer (DST): UTC+2 (CEST)
- Vehicle registration: BWM

Krasowo-Częstki [kraˈsɔvɔ ˈt͡ʂɛ̃stki] is a village in the administrative district of Gmina Nowe Piekuty, within Wysokie Mazowieckie County, Podlaskie Voivodeship, in north-eastern Poland.

== History ==
Following the joint German-Soviet invasion of Poland, which started World War II in September 1939, the village was first occupied by the Soviet Union until 1941, and then by Germany until 1944. On 13 July 1943, a battle between the German gendarmerie and a unit of the Polish Home Army was fought near the village. On 17 July 1943, Nazi Germans pacified the village, murdering 257 Polish citizens, including 83 children under the age of 17, and burning down their properties. This was the triggering event for the Raid on Mittenheide.
