= Stanisław Karolkiewicz =

Stanisław Karolkiewicz (nom de guerre Szczęsny) (1918–2009) was born in 1918 in the Polish historical region of Podlasie. Raised in a patriotic family, he joined the Polish Army in the 1930s, and then fought in the Polish September Campaign, in the area of Upper Silesia. On 17 September 1939, when the Red Army, allied with the Wehrmacht, attacked eastern Poland, Karolkiewicz was around Nisko.

Caught by the Germans, he escaped and returned to his homeland in the Białystok countryside, which had been incorporated to the Soviet Union. He immediately began organizing anti-Soviet resistance movement, taking advantage of the landscape of the province, full of forests and swamps. His unit stayed around Augustów, between the Biebrza river and the Augustów Canal.

In February 1940, the NKVD launched an offensive against anti-Soviet Polish guerillas, and Karolkiewicz was caught. The Soviets put him in prisons in Białystok and later in Brześć nad Bugiem. He was charged of counterrevolutionary activities, but, unlike other prisoners (see: Katyń massacre), he was not shot. Kept in the prison in Brzesc, he was released in June 1941, when the Wehrmacht seized the city (see: Operation Barbarossa).

Under German occupation, Karolkiewicz did not change his stance and became commandant of the Directorate of Sabotage and Diversion of the Białystok area. Then, he joined underground forces in Szczuczyn and was the commandant of the 1943 Polish underground raid on East Prussia, which took place on 15 August 1943. After the raid, Karolkiewicz and his men got to the Naliboki Forest, to join units of Wilno’s Home Army district and to take part in the Operation Tempest (summer 1944).

Karolkiewicz, who was a commandant of a Home Army company, participated in street fighting in the suburbs of Wilno. Shelled by the German artillery and attacked by the Luftwaffe aircraft, the company had to withdraw to a nearby forest. Soon afterwards, the NKVD units appeared and began to disarm the Poles. Karolkiewicz managed to escape the Soviets and headed towards Warsaw. He was caught by the NKVD in Warsaw’s eastern quarter of Praga, and incarcerated in the Lublin Castle prison.

The interrogation was at first carried out by the NKVD officers, then it was handed over to the Służba Bezpieczeństwa. Karolkiewicz, who was not considered a major threat to the Communist authorities, was released in mid-1945 and immediately became a member of anticommunist resistance organization Armed Forces Delegation for Poland. Arrested in February 1946, he was sentenced to 13 years and incarcerated in the Wronki prison. Together with him, the Communists arrested his wife, who gave birth to a daughter in a cell at Mokotów Prison. Karolkiewicz stayed in prison until October 1955.

In 1947 and 1948, Karolkiewicz was in the same cell with Władysław Bartoszewski. Bartoszewski later said in an interview: “I heard that he had had a very rough investigation, even for Communist reality. He was a legendary person, I heard opinions of him as a skillful commandant, about his legendary exploits during the war”.

In the 1990s, Karolkiewicz was elected President of World Society of Home Army Soldiers. On 3 May 2006 he was promoted to Brigade General, by President Lech Kaczyński. Stanislaw Karolkiewicz died on 22 January 2009.

== See also ==
- Polish contribution to World War II
