= Jabłoń-Piotrowce =

- Village
- Location within Poland
- Coordinates: 52°53′22″N 22°39′48″E
- Country: Poland
- Voivodeship: Podlaskie
- County: Wysokie Mazowieckie
- Gmina: Nowe Piekuty

Jabłoń-Piotrowce [ˈjabwɔɲ pjɔˈtrɔft͡sɛ] is a village in the administrative district of Gmina Nowe Piekuty, within Wysokie Mazowieckie County, Podlaskie Voivodeship, in north-eastern Poland.
