= Hodyszewo =

- Village
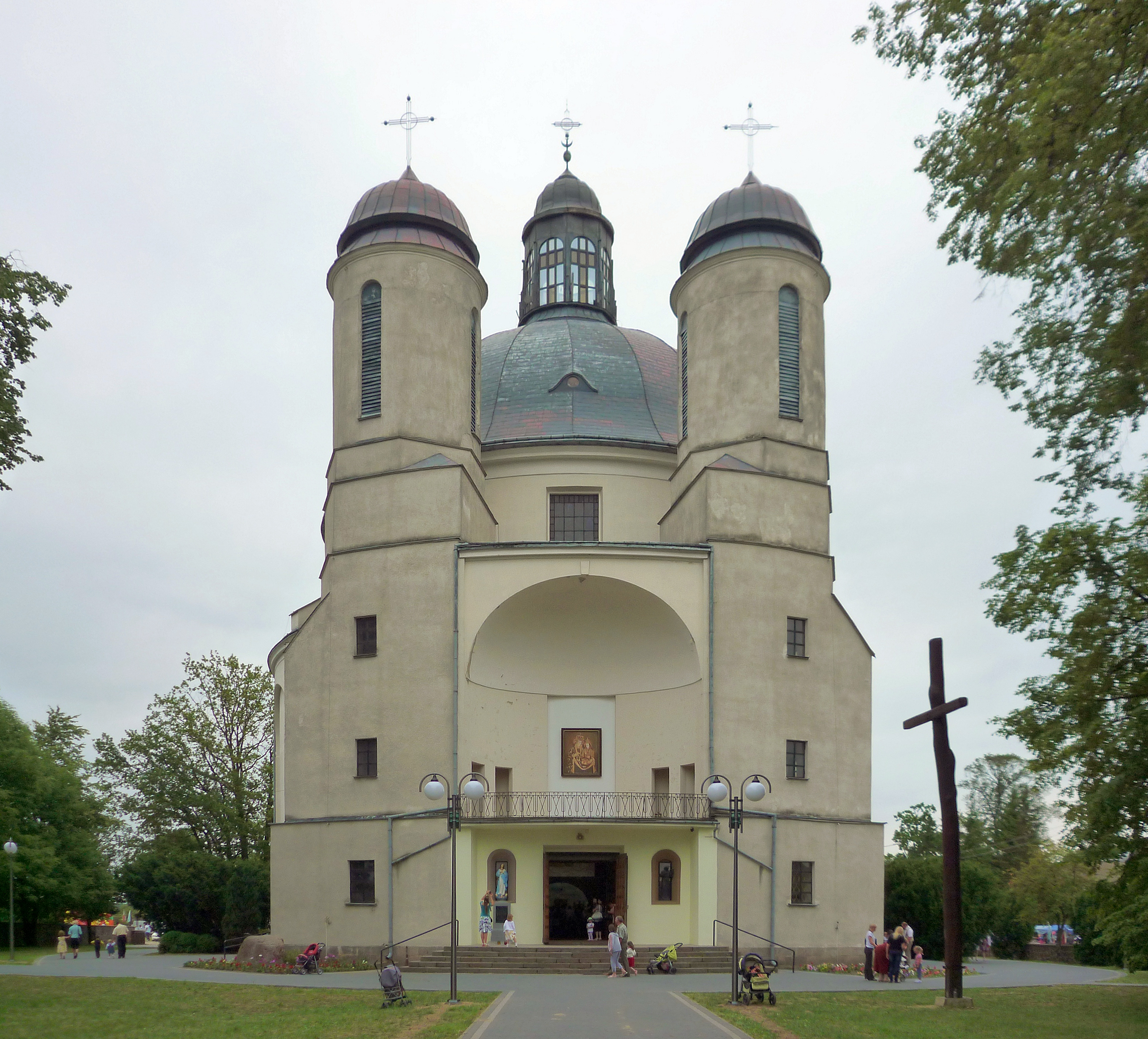

- Location within Poland
- Coordinates: 52°50′30″N 22°45′45″E
- Country: Poland
- Voivodeship: Podlaskie
- County: Wysokie Mazowieckie
- Gmina: Nowe Piekuty
- Population: 139 (2,011)

Hodyszewo [xɔdɨˈʂɛvɔ] is a village in the administrative district of Gmina Nowe Piekuty, within Wysokie Mazowieckie County, Podlaskie Voivodeship, in north-eastern Poland.
