= Jabłoń-Śliwowo =

- Village
- Location within Poland
- Coordinates: 52°54′12″N 22°41′11″E
- Country: Poland
- Voivodeship: Podlaskie
- County: Wysokie Mazowieckie
- Gmina: Nowe Piekuty

Jabłoń-Śliwowo [ˈjabwɔɲ ɕliˈvɔvɔ] is a village in the administrative district of Gmina Nowe Piekuty, within Wysokie Mazowieckie County, Podlaskie Voivodeship, in north-eastern Poland.
