= Jabłoń-Spały =

- Village
- Location within Poland
- Coordinates: 52°56′N 22°39′E
- Country: Poland
- Voivodeship: Podlaskie
- County: Wysokie Mazowieckie
- Gmina: Nowe Piekuty
- Population: 87

Jabłoń-Spały [ˈjabwɔɲ ˈspawɨ] is a village in the administrative district of Gmina Nowe Piekuty, within Wysokie Mazowieckie County, Podlaskie Voivodeship, in north-eastern Poland.
