= Jabłoń-Zarzeckie =

- Village
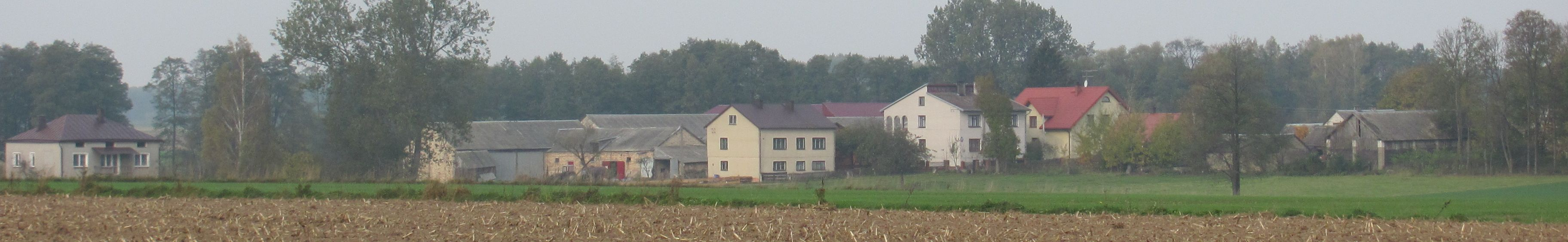
- Panoramic view of Jabłoń-Zarzeckie

- Location within Poland
- Coordinates: 52°56′13″N 22°39′06″E
- Country: Poland
- Voivodeship: Podlaskie
- County: Wysokie Mazowieckie
- Gmina: Nowe Piekuty

Jabłoń-Zarzeckie [ˈjabwɔɲ zaˈʐɛt͡skʲɛ] is a village in the administrative district of Gmina Nowe Piekuty, within Wysokie Mazowieckie County, Podlaskie Voivodeship, in north-eastern Poland.
