= Jabloň =

- Municipality
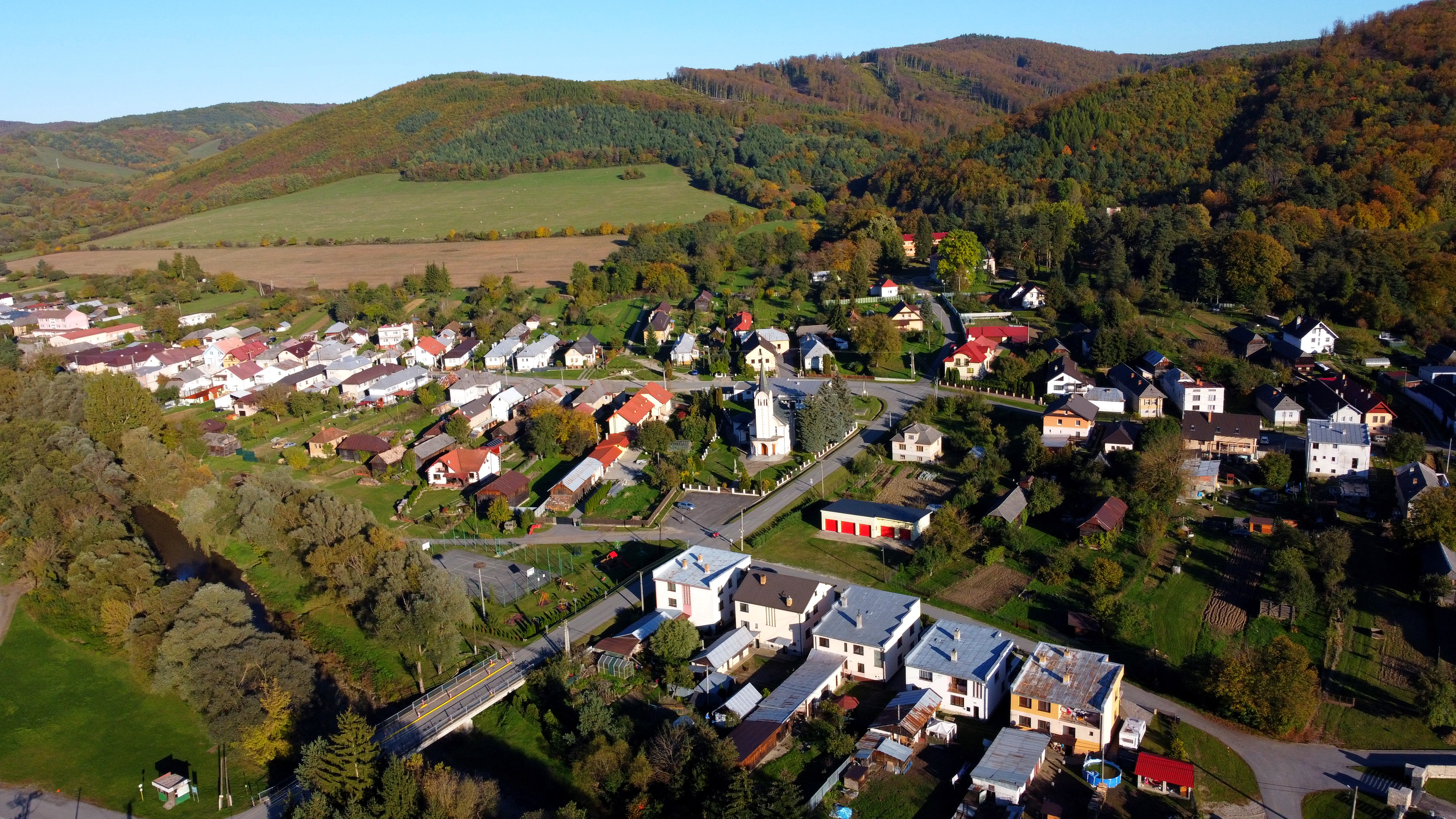

- Flag

- Location of Jabloň in the Prešov Region Location of Jabloň in Slovakia
- Coordinates: 49.07°N 21.98°E
- Country: Slovakia
- Region: Prešov Region
- District: Humenné District
- First mentioned: 1405

Area
  - Total: 11.86 km^{2} (4.58 sq mi)
- Elevation: 206 m (676 ft)

Population (2025)
  - Total: 369
- Time zone: UTC+1 (CET)
  - Summer (DST): UTC+2 (CEST)
- Postal code: 671 3
- Area code: +421 57
- Vehicle registration plate (until 2022): HE
- Website: www.obecjablon.sk

Jabloň is a village and municipality in Humenné District in the Prešov Region of north-east Slovakia.

== History ==
In historical records, the village was first mentioned in 1405.

== Geography ==
The municipality lies at an altitude of 206 metres (676 ft) and covers an area of 11.86 km^{2} (4.58 sq mi) (2025).

== Population ==
Population statistic (10 years)
Year	1995	2005	2015	2025
Count	487	449	410	369
Difference		−7.80%	−8.68%	−10%

Population statistic
Year	2024	2025
Count	374	369
Difference		−1.33%

It has a population of 369 people (31 December 2025).

=== Ethnicity ===
Census 2021 (1+ %)
Ethnicity	Number	Fraction
Slovak	386	98.46%
Rusyn	7	1.78%
Total	392	

In year 2021 was 392 people by ethnicity 386 as Slovak, 7 as Rusyn, 3 as Not found out and 1 as Polish.

Note on population: The difference values of population numbers in the table "Population statistic" and in the sections "Ethnicity" & "Religion" is caused by the use of various statistical methods.

=== Religion ===
Census 2021 (1+ %)
Religion	Number	Fraction
Roman Catholic Church	334	85.2%
None	33	8.42%
Greek Catholic Church	15	3.83%
Eastern Orthodox Church	5	1.28%
Total	392	

In year 2021 was 392 people by religion 334 from Roman Catholic Church, 33 from None, 15 from Greek Catholic Church, 5 from Eastern Orthodox Church, 3 from Not found out, 1 from Calvinist Church and 1 from Ad hoc movements.
