= Jabłoń-Markowięta =

- Village
- Location within Poland
- Coordinates: 52°55′46″N 22°38′23″E
- Country: Poland
- Voivodeship: Podlaskie
- County: Wysokie Mazowieckie
- Gmina: Nowe Piekuty

Jabłoń-Markowięta [ˈjabwɔɲ markɔˈvjɛnta] is a village in the administrative district of Gmina Nowe Piekuty, within Wysokie Mazowieckie County, Podlaskie Voivodeship, in north-eastern Poland.
