= Gmina Nowe Piekuty =

Gmina Nowe Piekuty Nowe Piekuty Commune
- Gmina
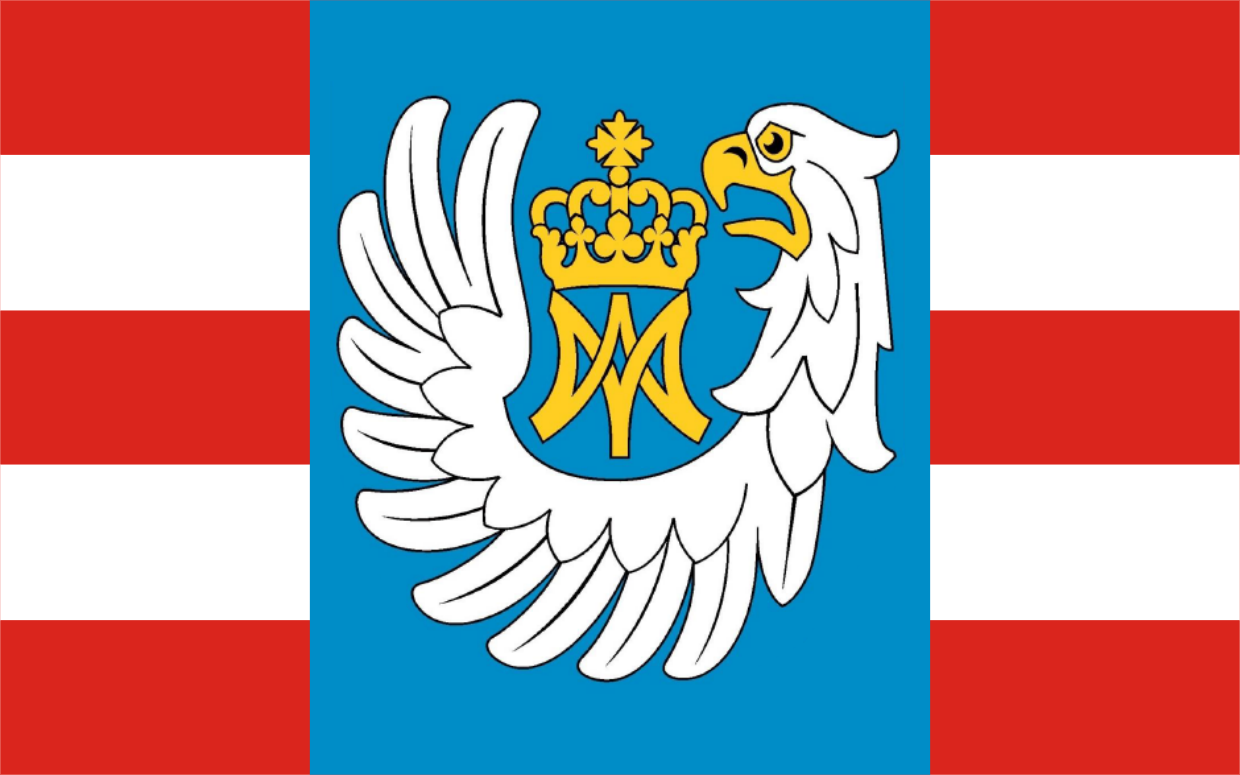
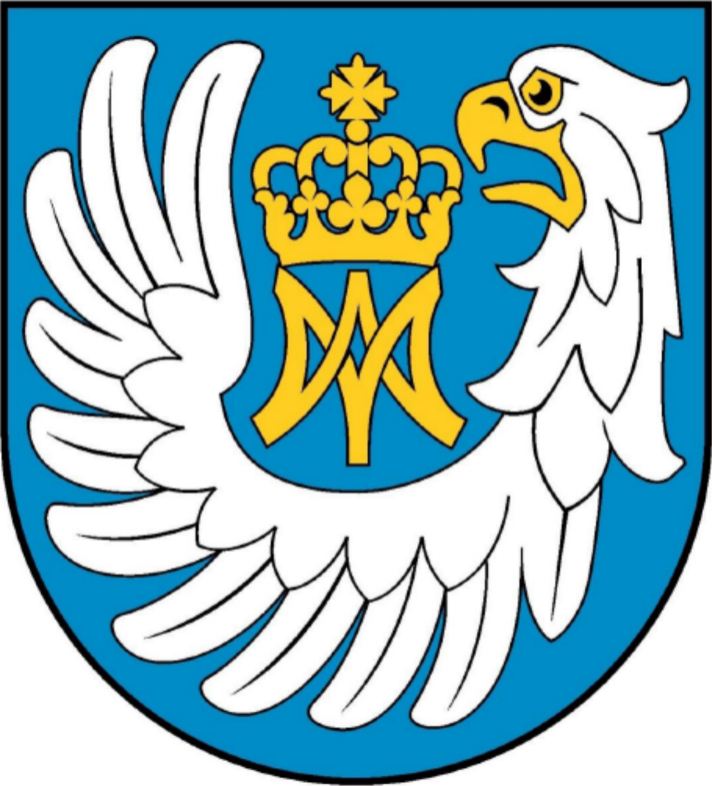
- Flag Coat of arms
- Interactive map of Gmina Nowe Piekuty
- Coordinates (Nowe Piekuty): 52°51′21″N 22°42′32″E
- Country: Poland
- Voivodeship: Podlaskie
- County: Wysokie Mazowieckie
- Seat: Nowe Piekuty

Area
  - Total: 109.37 km^{2} (42.23 sq mi)

Population (2013)
  - Total: 4,090
  - Density: 37.4/km^{2} (96.9/sq mi)

Gmina Nowe Piekuty is a rural gmina (administrative district) in Wysokie Mazowieckie County, Podlaskie Voivodeship, in north-eastern Poland. Its seat is the village of Nowe Piekuty, which lies approximately 15 kilometres (9 mi) south-east of Wysokie Mazowieckie and 43 km (27 mi) south-west of the regional capital Białystok.

The gmina covers an area of 109.37 square kilometres (42.2 sq mi), and as of 2006 its total population is 3,991 (4,090 in 2013).

== Villages ==
Gmina Nowe Piekuty contains the villages and settlements of Hodyszewo, Jabłoń Kościelna, Jabłoń-Dąbrowa, Jabłoń-Dobki, Jabłoń-Jankowce, Jabłoń-Markowięta, Jabłoń-Piotrowce, Jabłoń-Śliwowo, Jabłoń-Spały, Jabłoń-Zambrowizna, Jabłoń-Zarzeckie, Jośki, Koboski, Kostry-Litwa, Kostry-Noski, Krasowo Wielkie, Krasowo-Częstki, Krasowo-Siódmaki, Krasowo-Wólka, Lendowo-Budy, Łopienie-Jeże, Łopienie-Szelągi, Łopienie-Zyski, Markowo-Wólka, Nowe Piekuty, Nowe Rzepki, Nowe Żochy, Piekuty-Urbany, Pruszanka Mała, Skłody Borowe, Skłody-Przyrusy, Stare Żochy, Stokowisko, Tłoczewo and Wierzbowizna.

== Neighbouring gminas ==
Gmina Nowe Piekuty is bordered by the gminas of Brańsk, Poświętne, Sokoły, Szepietowo and Wysokie Mazowieckie.
