= Jabłoń-Dobki =

- Village
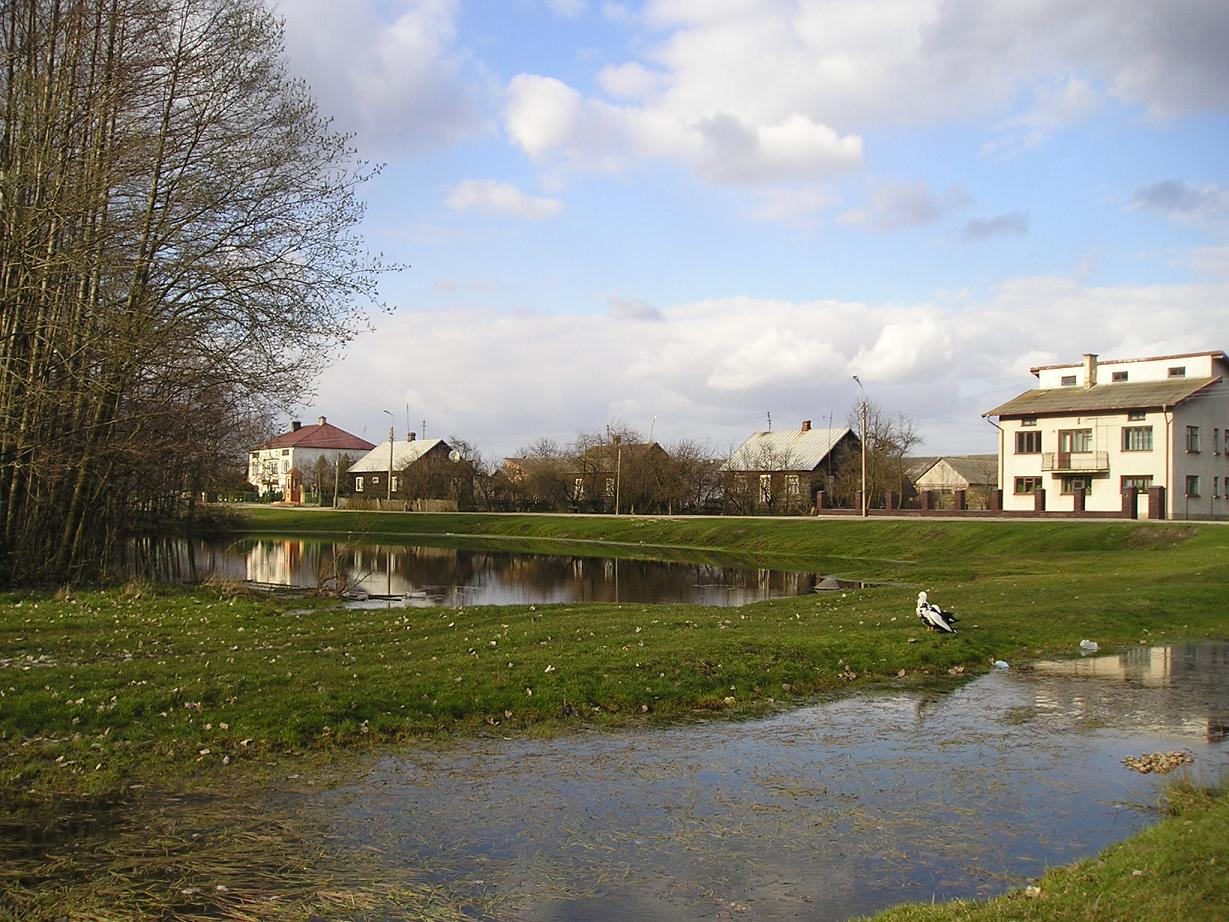

- Location within Poland
- Coordinates: 52°55′01″N 22°38′10″E
- Country: Poland
- Voivodeship: Podlaskie
- County: Wysokie Mazowieckie
- Gmina: Nowe Piekuty
- Time zone: UTC+1 (CET)
  - Summer (DST): UTC+2 (CEST)
- Vehicle registration: BWM

Jabłoń-Dobki [ˈjabwɔɲ ˈdɔpki] is a village in the administrative district of Gmina Nowe Piekuty, within Wysokie Mazowieckie County, Podlaskie Voivodeship, in north-eastern Poland.

== History ==
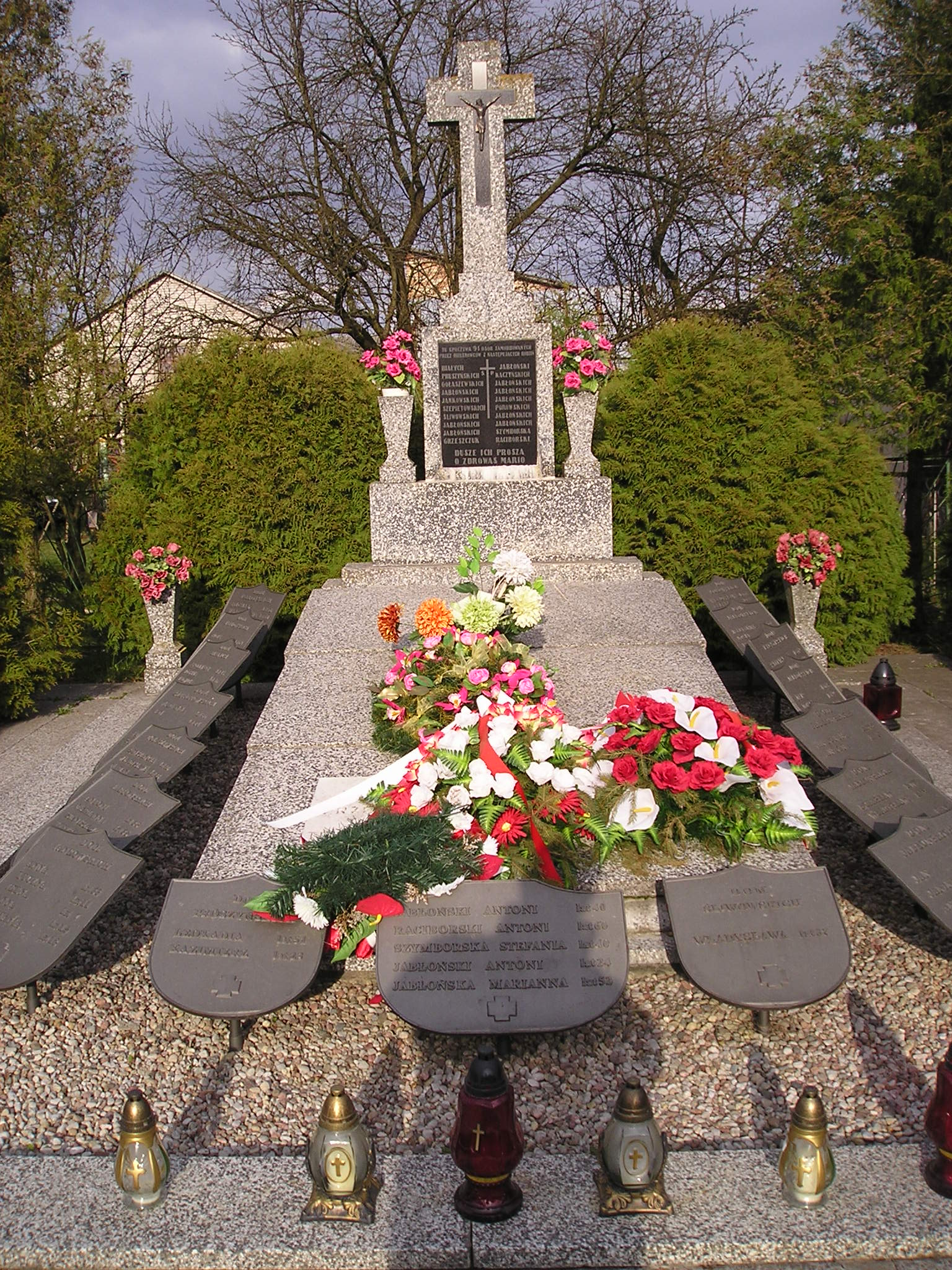
Mass grave of Poles massacred by the Germans in 1944

In 1827, the village had a population of 59.

Following the joint German-Soviet invasion of Poland, which started World War II in September 1939, the village was first occupied by the Soviet Union until 1941, and then by Germany until 1944. On March 8, 1944, in retaliation for the activity of the Polish resistance, the Germans pacified the village. The Germans forced the residents into a barn, then doused it with gasoline and threw grenades inside. 91 Poles were killed and burned alive, including 31 women and 31 children.
