= Szepietowo =

- Town
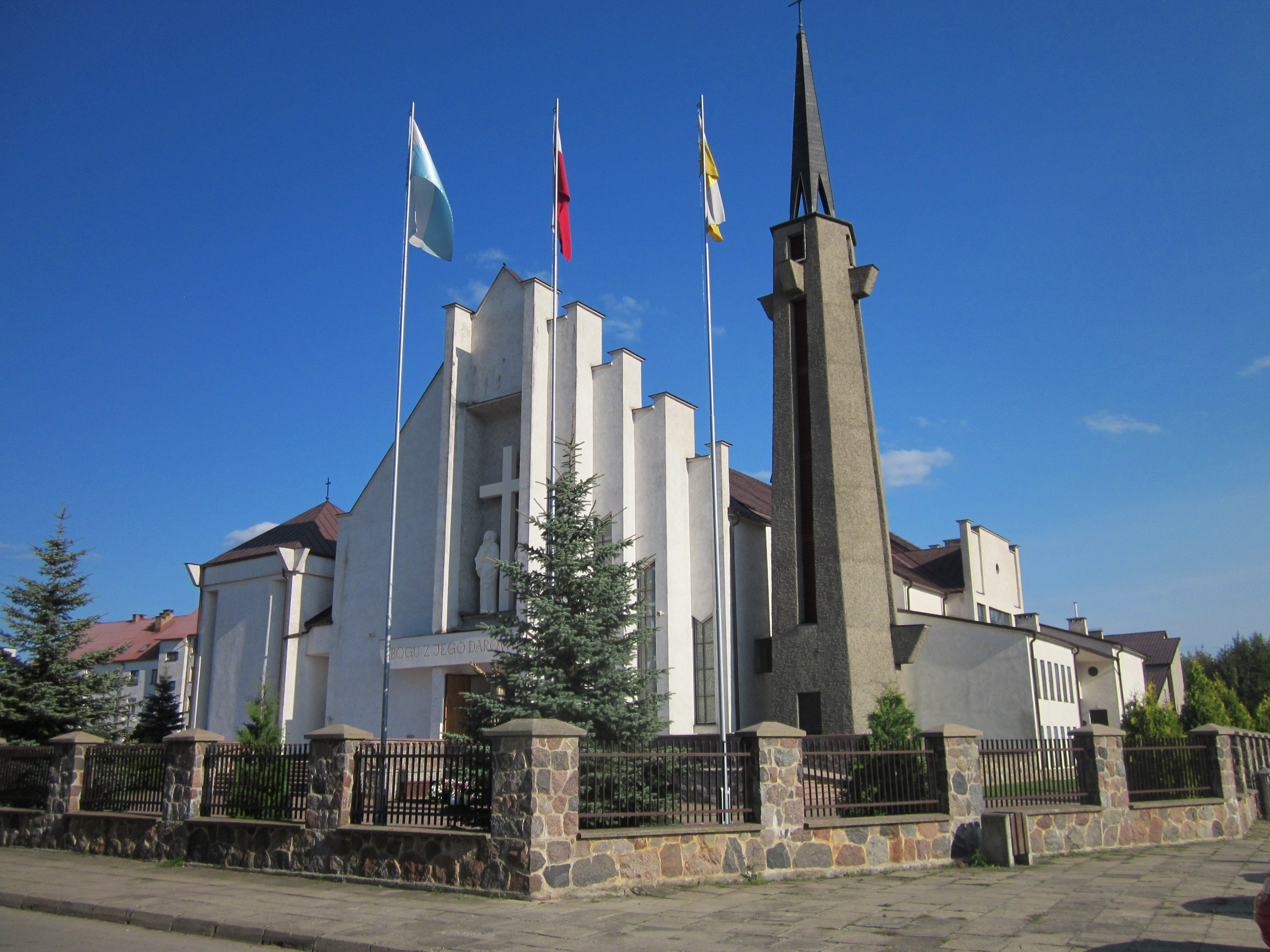
- Church of Our Lady of Mercy

- Location within Poland
- Coordinates: 52°52′11″N 22°32′47″E
- Country: Poland
- Voivodeship: Podlaskie
- County: Wysokie Mazowieckie
- Gmina: Szepietowo
- Population: 2,412
- Area code: +48 086
- Website: www.szepietowo.pl

Szepietowo [ʂɛpjɛˈtɔvɔ] is a town in Wysokie Mazowieckie County, Podlaskie Voivodeship, in north-eastern Poland. It is the seat of the gmina (administrative district) called Gmina Szepietowo.

Szepietowo has a population of 2,412. It gained town status on 1 January 2010.

== Transport ==
Szepietowo lies on national road 66 which connects it to Wysokie Mazowieckie and Bielsk Podlaski.

Szepietowo has a station on the important Polish railway line no. 6, connecting Zielonka in the Warsaw metropolitan area with Białystok and Kuźnica.
