= Nowe Piekuty =

- Village
- Location within Poland
- Coordinates: 52°51′21″N 22°42′32″E
- Country: Poland
- Voivodeship: Podlaskie
- County: Wysokie Mazowieckie
- Gmina: Nowe Piekuty
- Population: 2,100

Nowe Piekuty [ˈnɔvɛ pjɛˈkutɨ] is a village in Wysokie Mazowieckie County, Podlaskie Voivodeship, in north-eastern Poland. It is the seat of the gmina (administrative district) called Gmina Nowe Piekuty.
