= Jabłoń Kościelna =

- Village
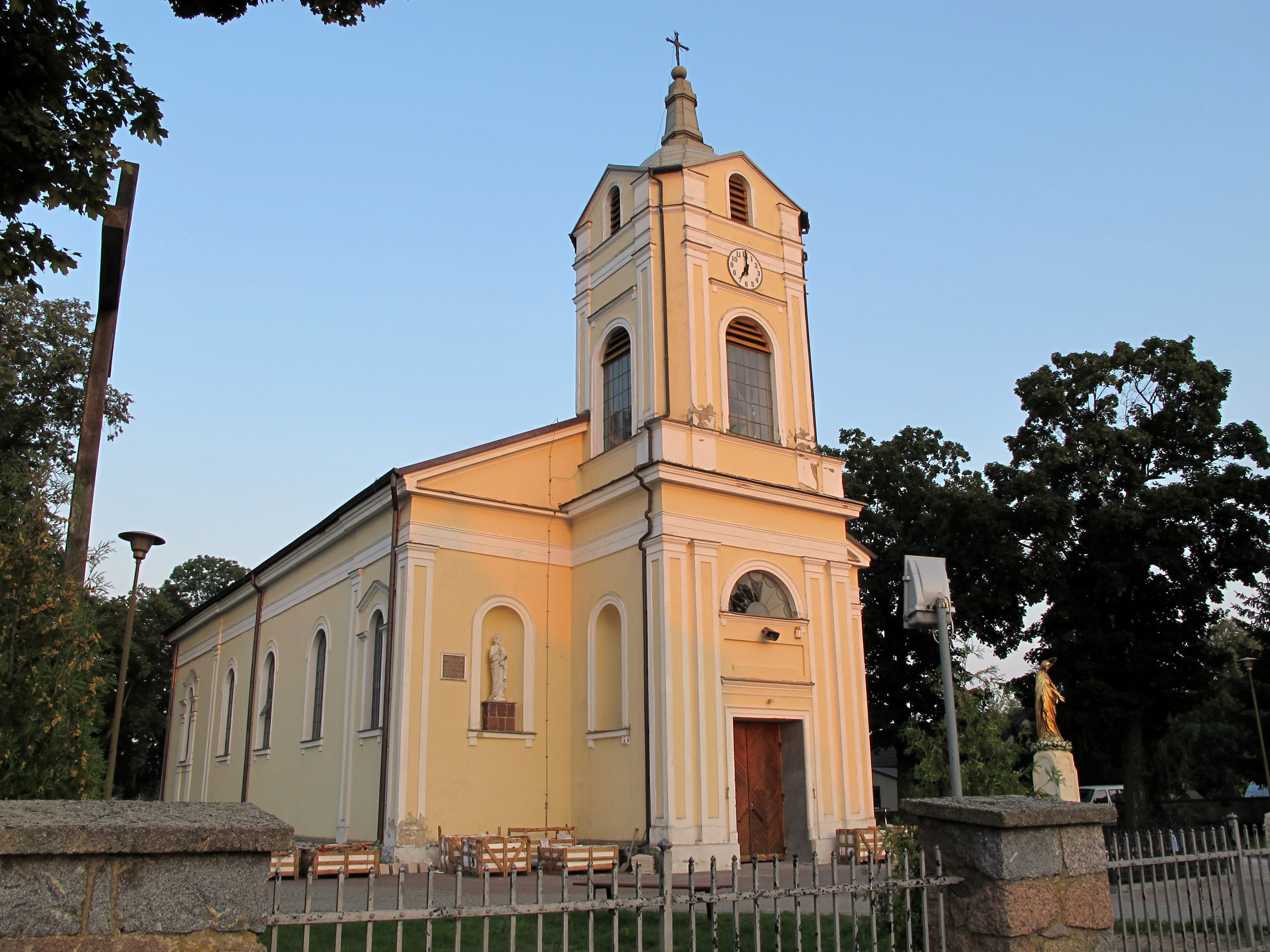

- Location within Poland
- Coordinates: 52°55′15″N 22°39′4″E
- Country: Poland
- Voivodeship: Podlaskie
- County: Wysokie Mazowieckie
- Gmina: Nowe Piekuty

Jabłoń Kościelna [ˈjabwɔɲ kɔɕˈt͡ɕɛlna] is a village in the administrative district of Gmina Nowe Piekuty, within Wysokie Mazowieckie County, Podlaskie Voivodeship, in north-eastern Poland.
