= Wysokie Mazowieckie County =

Wysokie Mazowieckie County Powiat wysokomazowiecki
- County
- Flag Coat of arms

- Location within the voivodeship
- Coordinates (Wysokie Mazowieckie): 52°55′9″N 22°30′52″E
- Country: Poland
- Voivodeship: Podlaskie
- Seat: Wysokie Mazowieckie
- Gminas: Total 10 (incl. 1 urban): Wysokie Mazowieckie; Gmina Ciechanowiec; Gmina Czyżew; Gmina Klukowo; Gmina Kobylin-Borzymy; Gmina Kulesze Kościelne; Gmina Nowe Piekuty; Gmina Sokoły; Gmina Szepietowo; Gmina Wysokie Mazowieckie

Area
  - Total: 1,288.49 km^{2} (497.49 sq mi)

Population (2019)
  - Total: 57,051
  - Density: 44.277/km^{2} (114.68/sq mi)
  - Urban: 18,849
  - Rural: 38,202
- Car plates: BWM
- Website: wysokomazowiecki.pl

Wysokie Mazowieckie County (Polish: powiat wysokomazowiecki) is a unit of territorial administration and local government (powiat) in Podlaskie Voivodeship, north-eastern Poland. It came into being on January 1, 1999, as a result of the Polish local government reforms passed in 1998. Its administrative seat and largest town is Wysokie Mazowieckie, which lies 49 kilometres (30 mi) south-west of the regional capital Białystok. The only other towns in the county are Ciechanowiec, lying 27 km (17 mi) south of Wysokie, Szepietowo, 6 km (4 mi) south of Wysokie, and as from 1 January 2011 Czyżew.

The county covers an area of 1,288.49 square kilometres (497.5 sq mi). As of 2019 its total population was 57,051, out of which the population of Wysokie Mazowieckie was 9,415, that of Ciechanowiec 4,631, that of Czyżew 2,633, that of Szepietowo 2,170, and the rural population 38,202.

== Neighbouring counties ==
Wysokie Mazowieckie County is bordered by Białystok County and Bielsk County to the east, Siemiatycze County and Sokołów County to the south, and Ostrów County and Zambrów County to the west.

== Administrative divisions ==
The county is subdivided into 10 gminas (one urban, three urban-rural and six rural). These are listed in the following table, in descending order of population.

Gmina	Type	Area (km^{2})	Population (2019)	Seat
Wysokie Mazowieckie	urban	15.2	9,415	
Gmina Ciechanowiec	urban-rural	201.5	8,619	Ciechanowiec
Gmina Szepietowo	urban-rural	151.9	6,913	Szepietowo
Gmina Czyżew	urban-rural	123.4	6,367	Czyżew
Gmina Sokoły	rural	155.6	5,744	Sokoły
Gmina Wysokie Mazowieckie	rural	166.1	5,436	Wysokie Mazowieckie *
Gmina Klukowo	rural	123.8	4,375	Klukowo
Gmina Nowe Piekuty	rural	109.4	3,879	Nowe Piekuty
Gmina Kobylin-Borzymy	rural	119.6	3,223	Kobylin-Borzymy
Gmina Kulesze Kościelne	rural	115.5	3,080	Kulesze Kościelne
* seat not part of the gmina

== Gallery ==
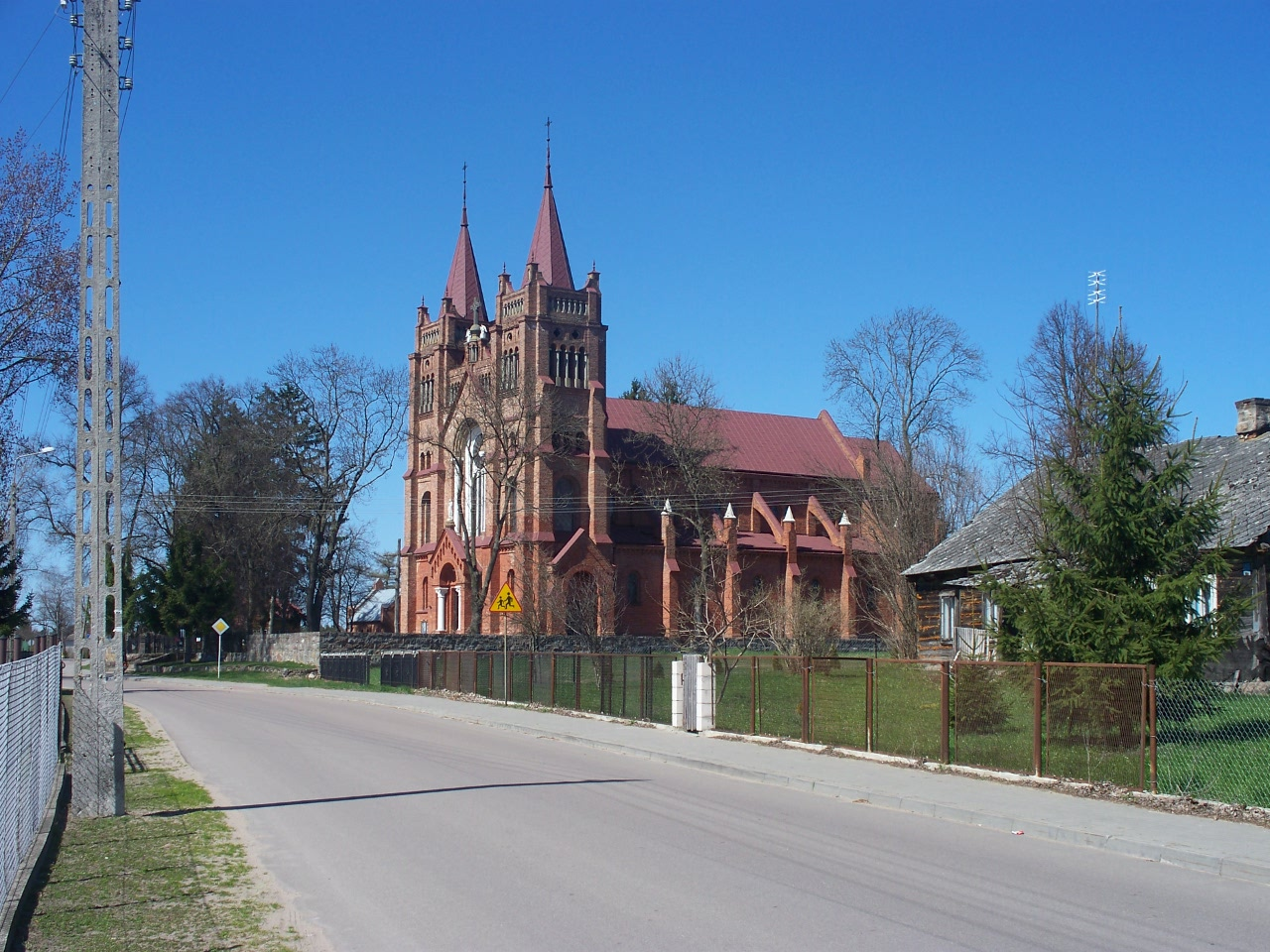
Gmina Czyżew
Dąbrowa Wielka

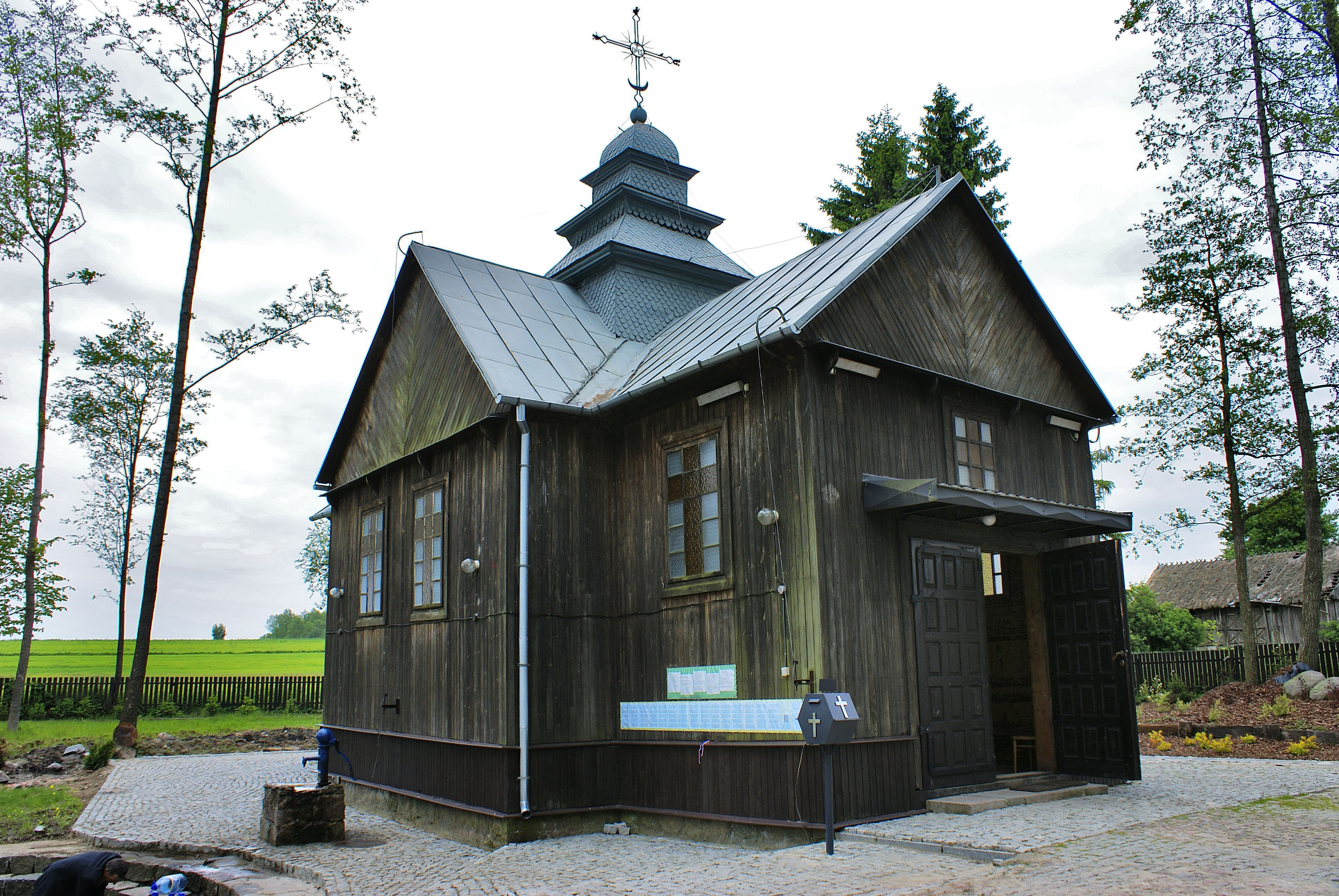
Gmina Nowe Piekuty
Hodyszewo

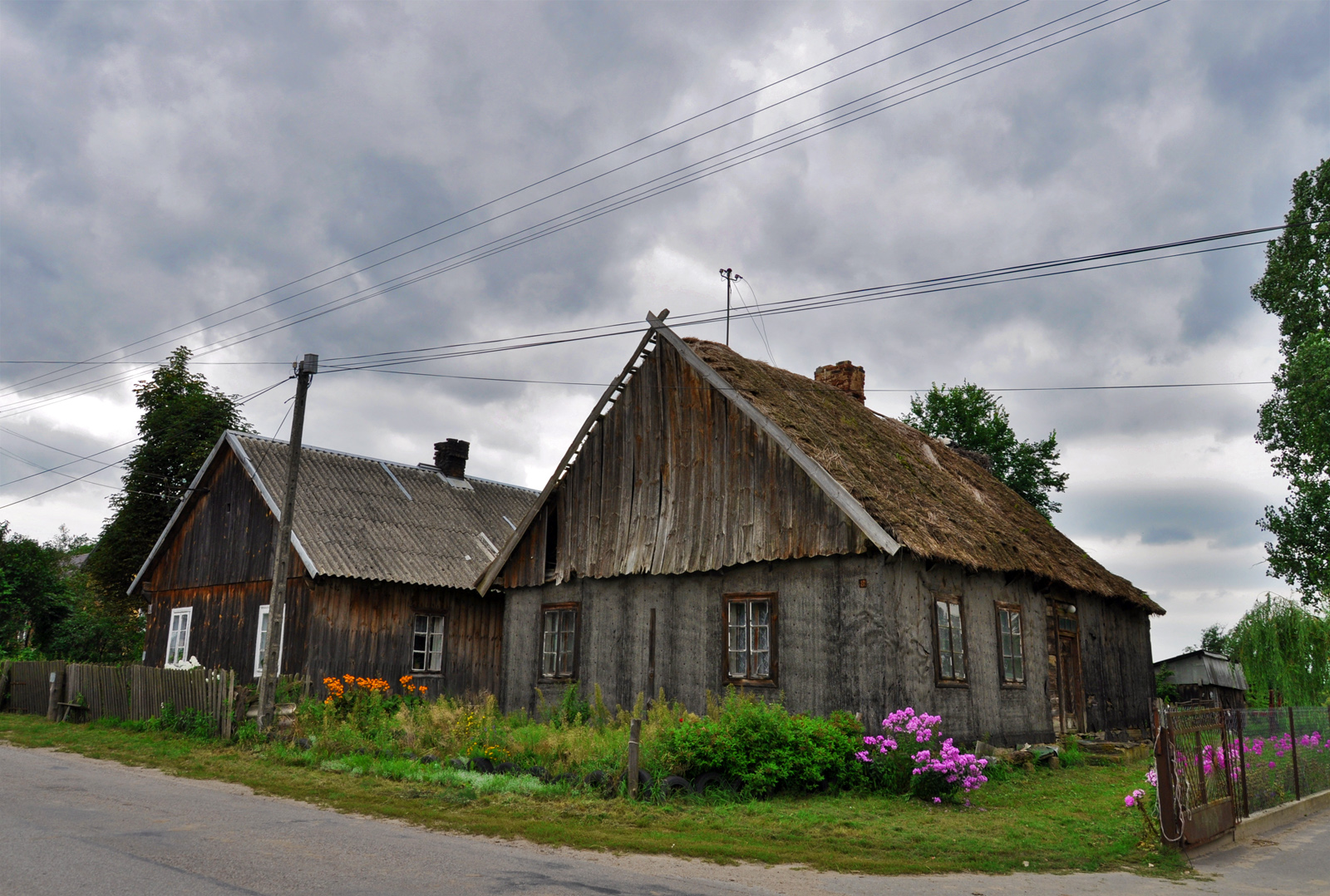
Gmina Wysokie Mazowieckie
Mścichy

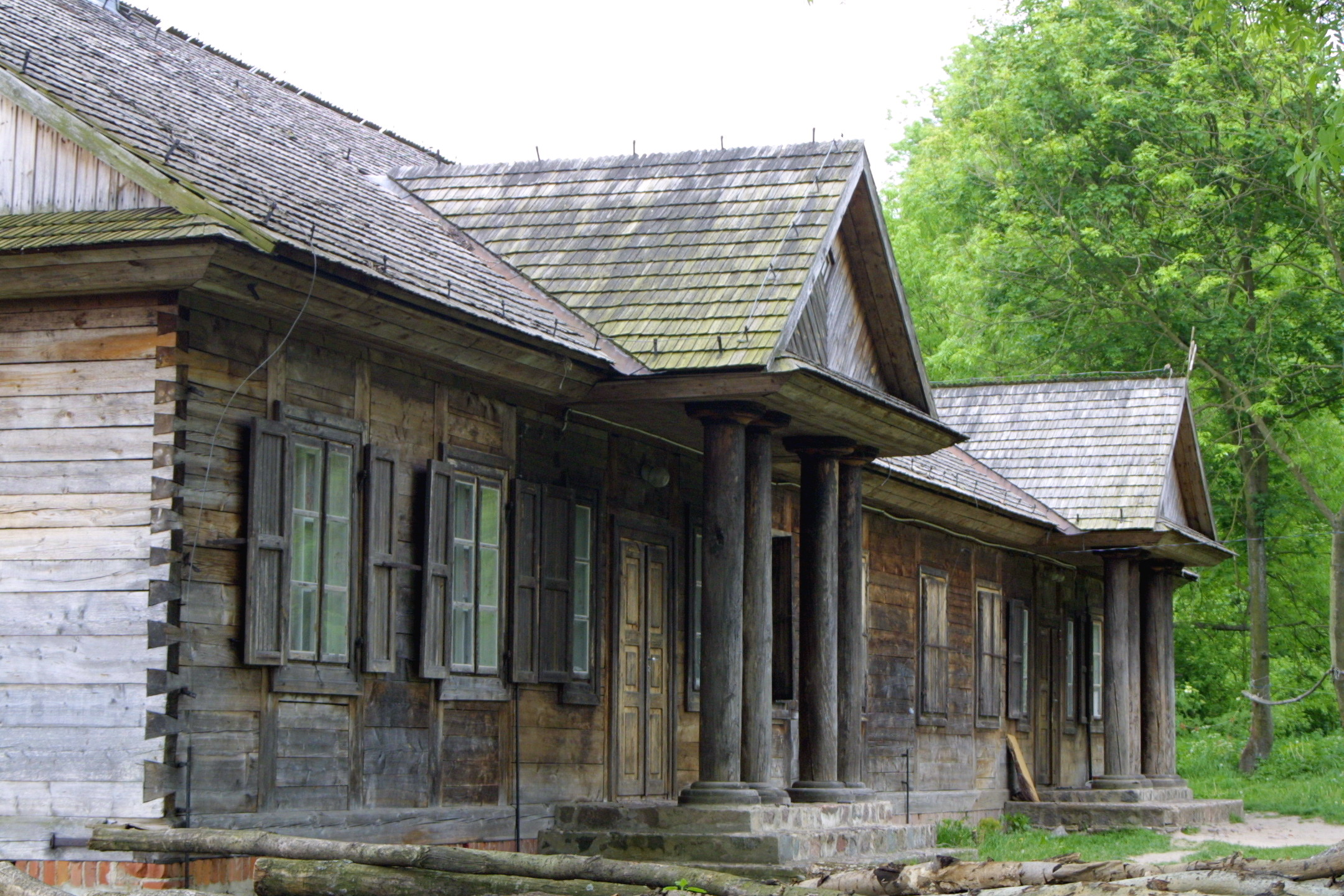
Gmina Ciechanowiec
Pobikry

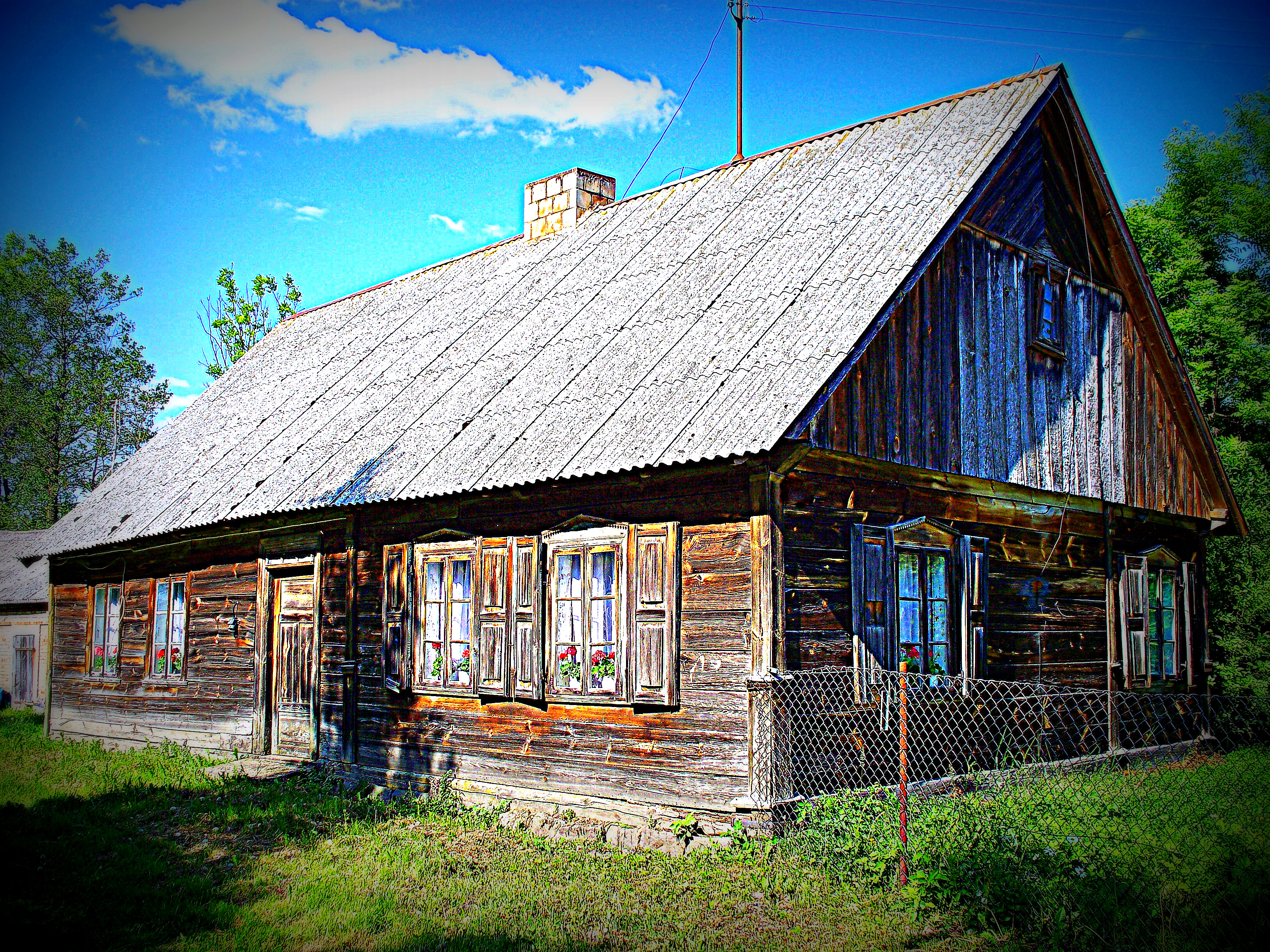
Gmina Szepietowo
Moczydły-Jakubowięta

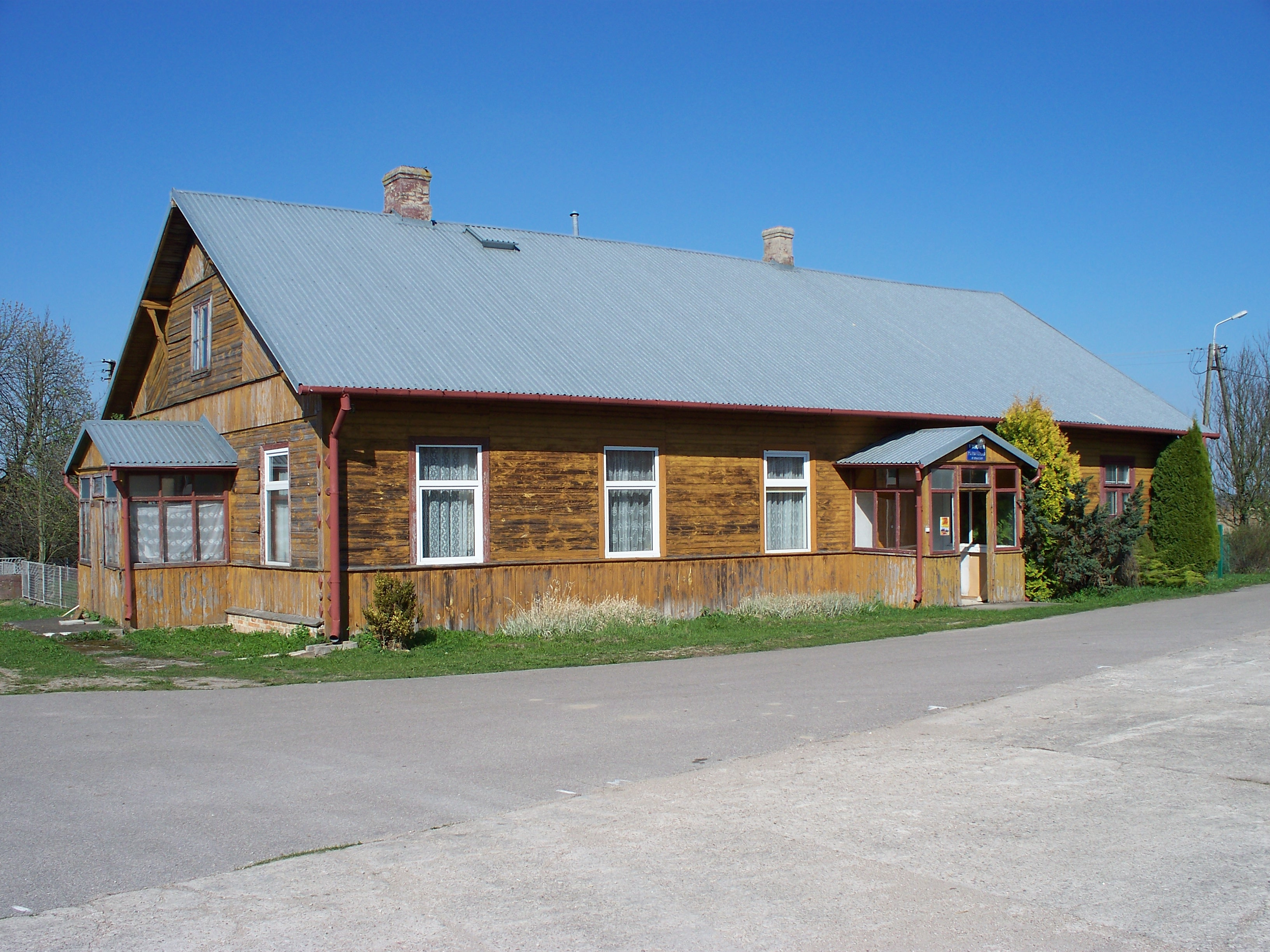
Gmina Sokoły
Waniewo
