= Wyszonki =

Estate in Podlasie, Poland

Coordinates: 52.762°N 22.625°E

Wyszonki ([vɨˈʂɔŋki]) is an okolica szlachecka in Podlasie, at the Nurzec river. It is the nest of Wyszyński noble family. It is divided into several villages:

- Wyszonki Kościelne (the central settlement, with the church)
- Wyszonki-Błonie
- Wyszonki-Klukówek
- Wyszonki-Nagórki
- Wyszonki-Włosty
- Wyszonki-Wojciechy
- Wyszonki-Wypychy
