= Czyżew (disambiguation) =

Czyżew is a town in Podlaskie Voivodeship, north-eastern Poland.

Czyżew may also refer to the following villages in Poland:

- Czyżew, Masovian Voivodeship
- Czyżew, Greater Poland Voivodeship
- Czyżew Kościelny
- Czyżew Ruś-Kolonia
- Czyżew Ruś-Wieś
- Gmina Czyżew
