= Brulino-Koski =

- Village
- Location within Poland
- Coordinates: 52°46′26″N 22°18′57″E
- Country: Poland
- Voivodeship: Podlaskie
- County: Wysokie Mazowieckie
- Gmina: Czyżew-Osada
- Elevation: 8 m (26 ft)
- Population (approx.): 90
- Postal code: 18-220
- Car plates: BWM

Brulino-Koski [bruˈlinɔ ˈkɔski] is a part of the village Brulino-Piwki in the administrative district of Gmina Czyżew-Osada, within Wysokie Mazowieckie County, Podlaskie Voivodeship, in north-eastern Poland.

In 1975-1998, the village belonged administratively to Łomża Voivideship. Until 31 December 2003 the village belonged to the Nur municipality in the Mazowieckie Voivodeship

The faithful of the Roman Catholic Church belong to the parish of St Apostles Peter and Paul in Czyzewo.

== History ==
Brulino was founded at the beginning of the 15th century by the Brulińskis of Pierzchała who came from Zakroczym. In the year 1576 the agricultural area was seven fields.

At the end of the 19th century, The village within the Brulino gentry area in Ostrów County, Szulborze-Koty Municipality and Czyżew Parish

== Places of Interest ==
- A neo-Baroque manor house, built in 1880 by Józef Godlewski to replace the wooden one. It was destroyed during World War II but was Rebuilt after the conflict.
- Roadside cross made of cast iron rods from around 1880-1890.
- Roman period cemetery - used between the late 3rd and late 4th and 5th centuries. It has corpse and skeletal burials. Only women were buried here. Racial composition similar to early medieval Slavic series. The finds testify to their strong connection with the material culture of eastern Pomerania. Some vessel types and metal objects have references to the Slavic-Baltic borderland.
- Russian soldiers' cemetery from World War I.

== See also ==
- Brulino-Piwki
