= Jaźwiny-Koczoty =

Village in Gmina Czyżew-Osada, Poland

- Village
- Location within Poland
- Coordinates: 52°47′08″N 22°21′43″E
- Country: Poland
- Voivodeship: Podlaskie
- County: Wysokie Mazowieckie
- Gmina: Czyżew-Osada
- Population: 49
- Postal code: 18-220
- Car plates: BWM

Jaźwiny-Koczoty [jaʑˈvinɨ kɔˈt͡ʂɔtɨ] is a village in the administrative district of Gmina Czyżew-Osada, within Wysokie Mazowieckie County, Podlaskie Voivodeship, in north-eastern Poland.

In 1975-1998, the village belonged administratively to Łomża Voivideship.

The faithful of the Roman Catholic Church belong to the parish of St Apostles Peter and Paul in Czyzewo.

== History ==
At the end of the 19th century, Jaźwiny-koczoty and Jaźwiny-pierdki were petty gentry villages in Ostrów poviat, Dmochy-Glinki municipality. Jaźwiny-koczoty had 7 houses and Jaźwiny-pierdki had 4 houses and 29 inhabitants.

In 1921 there were 4 buildings with residential purposes and 36. inhabitants (18 men and 18 women). All reported Polish nationality.
