= Stare Zalesie =

Stare Zalesie may refer to the following places:

- Stare Zalesie, Bielsk County in Podlaskie Voivodeship (north-east Poland)
- Stare Zalesie, Gmina Czyżew-Osada in Podlaskie Voivodeship (north-east Poland)
- Stare Zalesie, Gmina Klukowo in Podlaskie Voivodeship (north-east Poland)
- Stare Zalesie, Zambrów County in Podlaskie Voivodeship (north-east Poland)
