= Kuczyn =

Kuczyn may refer to the following places in Poland:

- Kuczyn, Mońki County
- Kuczyn, Wysokie Mazowieckie County
