= Brulino-Piwki =

- Village
- Location within Poland
- Coordinates: 52°46′17″N 22°19′14″E
- Country: Poland
- Voivodeship: Podlaskie
- County: Wysokie Mazowieckie
- Gmina: Czyżew-Osada
- Population: 148
- Postal code: 18-220
- Car plates: BWM

Brulino-Piwki [bruˈlinɔ ˈpifki] is a village in the administrative district of Gmina Czyżew-Osada, within Wysokie Mazowieckie County, Podlaskie Voivodeship, in north-eastern Poland.

From 1975-1998, the village belonged administratively to Łomża Voivideship. Until 31 December 2003 the village belonged to the Nur municipality in the Mazowieckie Voivodeship.

The faithful of the Roman Catholic Church belong to the parish of St Apostles Peter and Paul in Czyzewo.

== History ==
Brulino was founded at the beginning of the 15th century by the Brulińskis of Pierzchała who came from Zakroczym. In the year 1576 the agricultural area was 7 fields.

At the end of the 19th century, The village within the Brulino gentry area in Ostrów County, Szulborze-Koty Municipality and Czyżew Parish.

== Places of Interest ==
- A neo-Baroque manor house, built in 1880 by Józef Godlewski to replace the wooden one. It was destroyed during World War II but was Rebuilt after the conflict.
- Roadside cross made of cast iron rods from around 1880-1890.
