= Piętki-Szeligi =

Village in Gmina Klukowo, Poland

- Village
- Location within Poland
- Coordinates: 52°47′14″N 22°32′19″E
- Country: Poland
- Voivodeship: Podlaskie
- County: Wysokie Mazowieckie
- Gmina: Klukowo

Piętki-Szeligi [ˈpjɛntki ʂɛˈliɡi] is a village in the administrative district of Gmina Klukowo, within Wysokie Mazowieckie County, Podlaskie Voivodeship, in north-eastern Poland.
