= Gródek, Wysokie Mazowieckie County =

Gródek
- Village
- Location within Poland
- Coordinates: 52°44′N 22°33′E
- Country: Poland
- Voivodeship: Podlaskie
- County: Wysokie Mazowieckie
- Gmina: Klukowo

Gródek [ˈɡrudɛk] is a village in the administrative district of Gmina Klukowo, within Wysokie Mazowieckie County, Podlaskie Voivodeship, in north-eastern Poland.
