= Kostry-Śmiejki =

- Village
- Location within Poland
- Coordinates: 52°46′08″N 22°34′05″E
- Country: Poland
- Voivodeship: Podlaskie
- County: Wysokie Mazowieckie
- Gmina: Klukowo

Kostry-Śmiejki [ˈkɔstrɨ ˈɕmjɛi̯ki] is a village in the administrative district of Gmina Klukowo within Wysokie Mazowieckie County, Podlaskie Voivodeship, in north-eastern Poland.
