= Malinowo, Wysokie Mazowieckie County =

Malinowo
- Village
- Location within Poland
- Coordinates: 52°43′19″N 22°30′28″E
- Country: Poland
- Voivodeship: Podlaskie
- County: Wysokie Mazowieckie
- Gmina: Klukowo

Malinowo [maliˈnɔvɔ] is a village in the administrative district of Gmina Klukowo, within Wysokie Mazowieckie County, Podlaskie Voivodeship, in north-eastern Poland.
