= Rosochate Nartołty =

Village in Gmina Czyżew-Osada, Poland

- Village
- Location within Poland
- Coordinates: 52°51′30″N 22°22′29″E
- Country: Poland
- Voivodeship: Podlaskie
- County: Wysokie Mazowieckie
- Gmina: Czyżew-Osada
- Postal code: 18-220
- Vehicle registration: BMN

Rosochate Nartołty [rɔsɔˈxatɛ narˈtɔu̯tɨ] is a village in the administrative district of Gmina Czyżew-Osada, within Wysokie Mazowieckie County, Podlaskie Voivodeship, in north-eastern Poland.

A Polish citizen was murdered by Nazi Germany in the village during World War II.
