= Michałowo Wielkie =

Village in Gmina Czyżew-Osada, Poland

- Village
- Location within Poland
- Coordinates: 52°46′24″N 22°19′39″E
- Country: Poland
- Voivodeship: Podlaskie
- County: Wysokie Mazowieckie
- Gmina: Czyżew-Osada

Michałowo Wielkie [mixaˈwɔvɔ ˈvjɛlkʲɛ] is a village in the administrative district of Gmina Czyżew-Osada, within Wysokie Mazowieckie County, Podlaskie Voivodeship, in north-eastern Poland.
