= Dąbrowa-Kity =

- Village
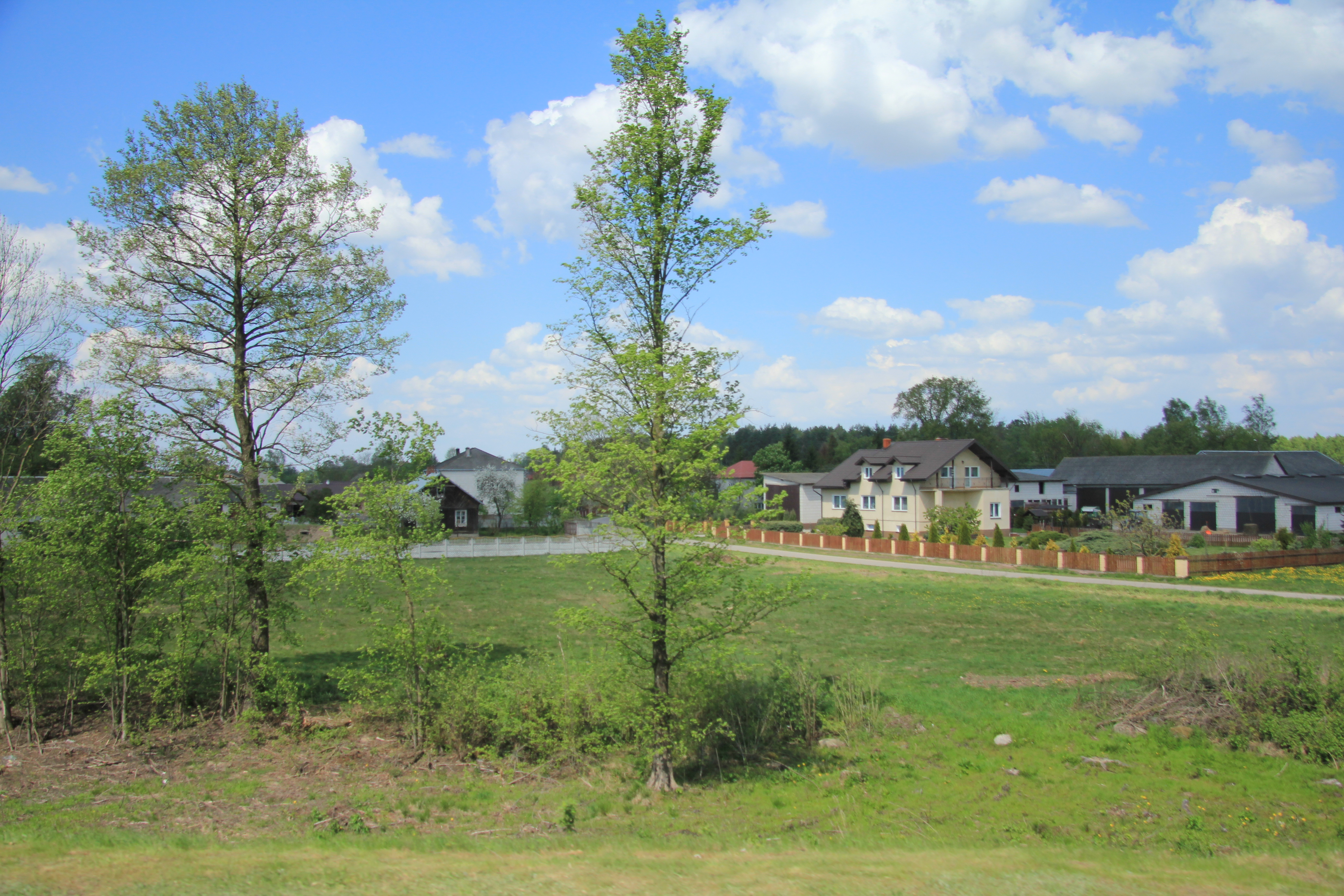

- Location within Poland
- Coordinates: 52°49′44″N 22°25′06″E
- Country: Poland
- Voivodeship: Podlaskie
- County: Wysokie Mazowieckie
- Gmina: Czyżew-Osada
- Population: 12
- Postal code: 18-220
- Vehicle registration: BWM

Dąbrowa-Kity [dɔmˈbrɔva ˈkitɨ] is a village in the administrative district of Gmina Czyżew-Osada, within Wysokie Mazowieckie County, Podlaskie Voivodeship, in north-eastern Poland.
