= Stare Kostry =

- Village
- Location within Poland
- Coordinates: 52°45′34″N 22°34′35″E
- Country: Poland
- Voivodeship: Podlaskie
- County: Wysokie Mazowieckie
- Gmina: Klukowo

Stare Kostry [ˈstarɛ ˈkɔstrɨ] is a village in the administrative district of Gmina Klukowo, within Wysokie Mazowieckie County, Podlaskie Voivodeship, in north-eastern Poland.
