= Kaliski, Podlaskie Voivodeship =

Kaliski
- Village
- Location within Poland
- Coordinates: 52°44′09″N 22°31′39″E
- Country: Poland
- Voivodeship: Podlaskie
- County: Wysokie Mazowieckie
- Gmina: Klukowo

Kaliski [kaˈliski] is a village in the administrative district of Gmina Klukowo, within Wysokie Mazowieckie County, Podlaskie Voivodeship, in north-eastern Poland.
