= Gmina Klukowo =

Gmina Klukowo Klukowo Commune
- Gmina
- Interactive map of Gmina Klukowo
- Coordinates: 52°45′20″N 22°32′40″E
- Country: Poland
- Voivodeship: Podlaskie
- County: Wysokie Mazowieckie
- Seat: Klukowo

Area
  - Total: 123.77 km^{2} (47.79 sq mi)

Population (2013)
  - Total: 4,557
  - Density: 36.82/km^{2} (95.36/sq mi)
- Website: http://www.klukowo.pl

Gmina Klukowo is a rural gmina (administrative district) in Wysokie Mazowieckie County, Podlaskie Voivodeship, in north-eastern Poland. Its seat is the village of Klukowo, which lies approximately 17 kilometres (11 mi) south of Wysokie Mazowieckie and 60 km (37 mi) south-west of the regional capital Białystok.

The gmina covers an area of 123.77 square kilometres (47.8 sq mi), and as of 2006 its total population is 4,681 (4,557 in 2013).

== Villages ==
Gmina Klukowo contains the villages and settlements of Gródek, Janki, Kaliski, Kapłań, Klukowo, Klukowo-Kolonia, Kostry-Podsędkowięta, Kostry-Śmiejki, Kuczyn, Lubowicz Wielki, Lubowicz-Byzie, Lubowicz-Kąty, Łuniewo Małe, Łuniewo Wielkie, Malinowo, Piętki-Basie, Piętki-Gręzki, Piętki-Szeligi, Piętki-Żebry, Sobolewo, Stare Kostry, Stare Warele, Stare Zalesie, Trojanówek, Trojanowo, Usza Mała, Usza Wielka, Wiktorzyn, Wyszonki Kościelne, Wyszonki-Błonie, Wyszonki-Klukówek, Wyszonki-Nagórki, Wyszonki-Włosty, Wyszonki-Wojciechy, Wyszonki-Wypychy, Żabiniec and Żebry Wielkie.

== Neighbouring gminas ==
Gmina Klukowo is bordered by the gminas of Boguty-Pianki, Brańsk, Ciechanowiec, Czyżew-Osada, Rudka and Szepietowo.
