= Piętki-Basie =

- Village
- Location within Poland
- Coordinates: 52°46′54″N 22°33′17″E
- Country: Poland
- Voivodeship: Podlaskie
- County: Wysokie Mazowieckie
- Gmina: Klukowo

Piętki-Basie [ˈpjɛntki ˈbaɕɛ] is a village in the administrative district of Gmina Klukowo, within Wysokie Mazowieckie County, Podlaskie Voivodeship, in north-eastern Poland.
