= Janki, Podlaskie Voivodeship =

Janki
- Village
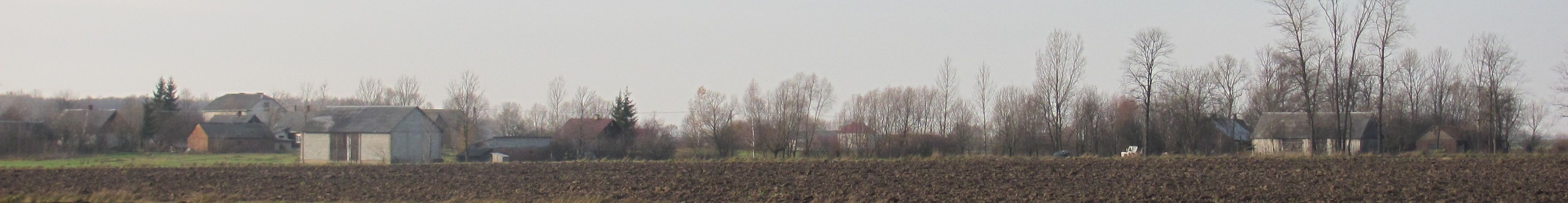
- Panoramic view of the village

- Location within Poland
- Coordinates: 52°44′05″N 22°31′33″E
- Country: Poland
- Voivodeship: Podlaskie
- County: Wysokie Mazowieckie
- Gmina: Klukowo

Janki [ˈjanki] is a village in the administrative district of Gmina Klukowo, within Wysokie Mazowieckie County, Podlaskie Voivodeship, in north-eastern Poland.
