= Trojanówek =

- Village
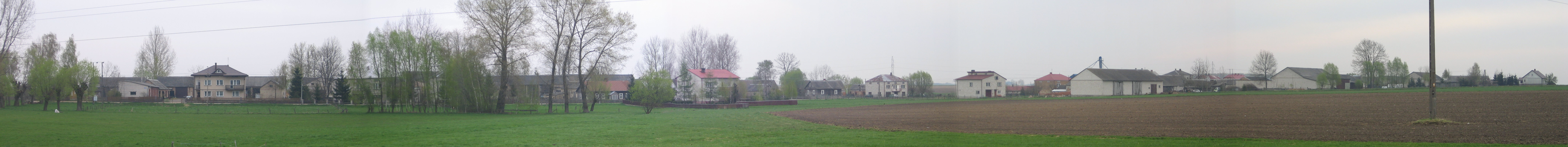
- The Village Panorama

- Location within Poland
- Coordinates: 52°45′32″N 22°31′11″E
- Country: Poland
- Voivodeship: Podlaskie
- County: Wysokie Mazowieckie
- Gmina: Klukowo

Trojanówek [trɔjaˈnuvɛk] is a village in the administrative district of Gmina Klukowo, within Wysokie Mazowieckie County, Podlaskie Voivodeship, in north-eastern Poland.
