= Klukowo-Kolonia =

- Village
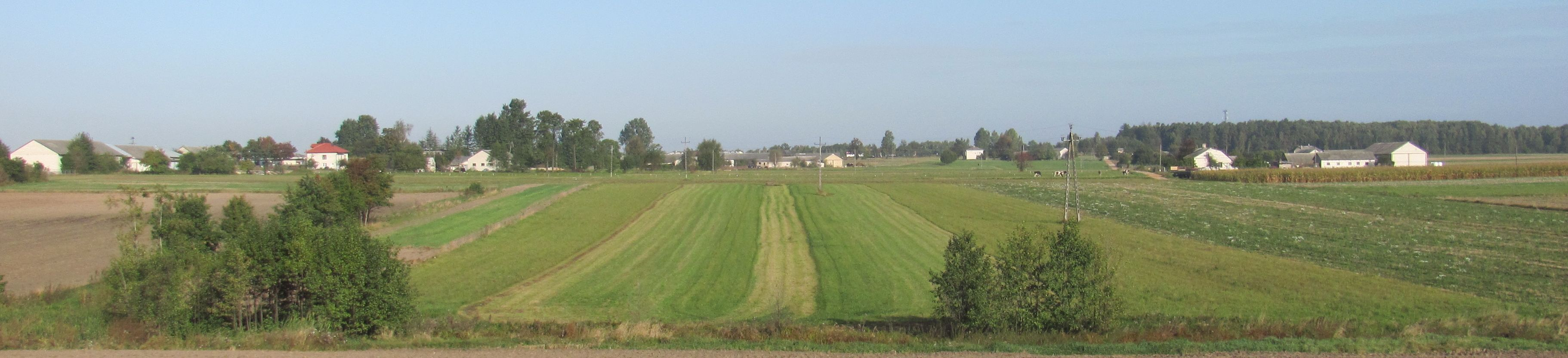
- Panoramic view of Klukowo-Kolonia

- Location within Poland
- Coordinates: 52°47′10″N 22°30′09″E
- Country: Poland
- Voivodeship: Podlaskie
- County: Wysokie Mazowieckie
- Gmina: Klukowo

Klukowo-Kolonia [kluˈkɔvɔ kɔˈlɔɲa] is a village in the administrative district of Gmina Klukowo, within Wysokie Mazowieckie County, Podlaskie Voivodeship, in north-eastern Poland.
