= Kaczyn-Herbasy =

- Village
- Location within Poland
- Coordinates: 52°53′21″N 22°21′12″E
- Country: Poland
- Voivodeship: Podlaskie
- County: Wysokie Mazowieckie
- Gmina: Czyżew-Osada

Kaczyn-Herbasy [ˈkat͡ʂɨn xɛrˈbasɨ] is a village in the administrative district of Gmina Czyżew-Osada, within Wysokie Mazowieckie County, Podlaskie Voivodeship, in north-eastern Poland.
