= Sobolewo, Wysokie Mazowieckie County =

Sobolewo
- Village
- Location within Poland
- Coordinates: 52°48′N 22°29′E
- Country: Poland
- Voivodeship: Podlaskie
- County: Wysokie Mazowieckie
- Gmina: Klukowo

Sobolewo [sɔbɔˈlɛvɔ] is a village in the administrative district of Gmina Klukowo, within Wysokie Mazowieckie County, Podlaskie Voivodeship, in north-eastern Poland.
