= Krzeczkowo-Nowe Bieńki =

- Village
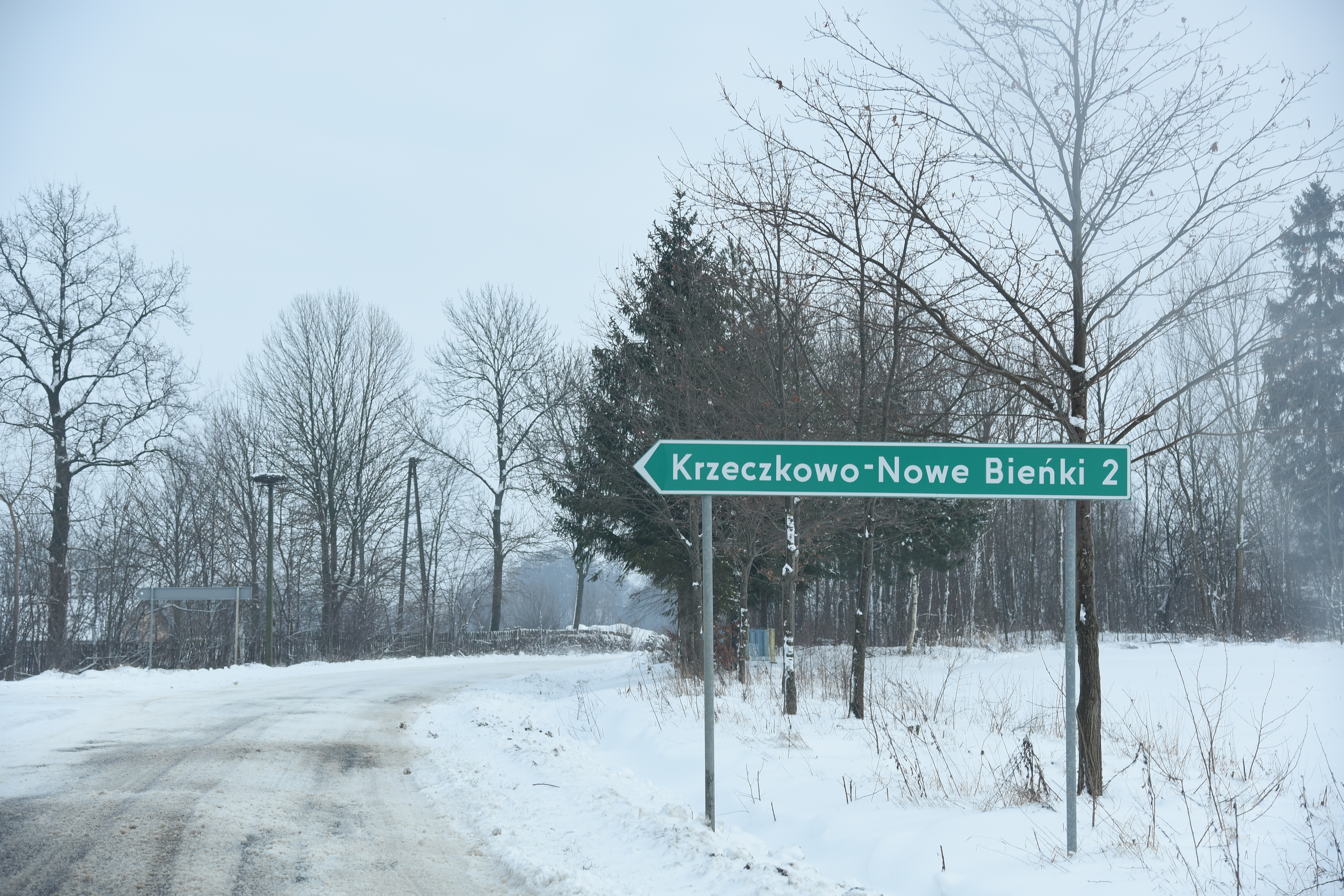

- Location within Poland
- Coordinates: 52°49′45″N 22°21′45″E
- Country: Poland
- Voivodeship: Podlaskie
- County: Wysokie Mazowieckie
- Gmina: Czyżew-Osada

Krzeczkowo-Nowe Bieńki [kʂɛt͡ʂˈkɔvɔ ˈnɔvɛ ˈbjɛɲki] is a village in the administrative district of Gmina Czyżew-Osada, within Wysokie Mazowieckie County, Podlaskie Voivodeship, in north-eastern Poland.
