= Zamastochcha =

Zamastochcha (Belarusian: Замасточча) or Zamostochye (Russian: Замосточье) may refer to the following places in Belarus:

- Zamastochcha, Byerazino District, a village in Byerazino District, Minsk Region
- Zamastochcha, Chervyen District, a village in Chervyen District, Minsk Region
- Zamastochcha, Dokshytsy District, an agrotown in Dokshytsy District, Vitebsk Region
- Zamastochcha, Hlusk District, a village in Hlusk District, Mogilev Region
- Zamastochcha, Lahoysk District, a village in Lahoysk District, Minsk Region
- Zamastochcha, Minsk District, an agrotown in Minsk District, Minsk Region
- Zamastochcha, Orsha District, a village in Orsha District, Vitebsk Region
- Zamastochcha, Vitebsk District, a village in Vitebsk District, Vitebsk Region
