= Lubowicz-Byzie =

- Village
- Location within Poland
- Coordinates: 52°45′35″N 22°34′00″E
- Country: Poland
- Voivodeship: Podlaskie
- County: Wysokie Mazowieckie
- Gmina: Klukowo
- Population: 44

Lubowicz-Byzie (Polish pronunciation: [luˈbɔvidʐ ˈbɨʑɛ]) is a village in the administrative district of Gmina Klukowo, within Wysokie Mazowieckie County, Podlaskie Voivodeship, in north-eastern Poland.
