= Kapłań =

- Village
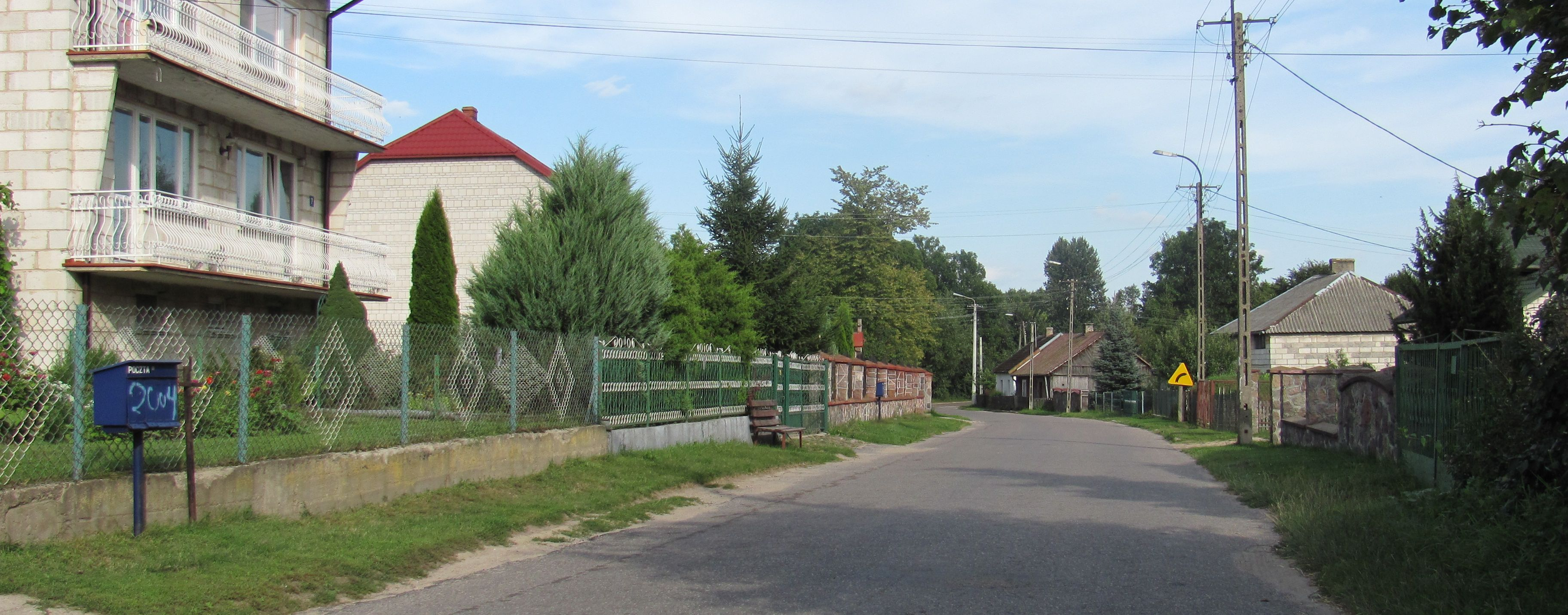
- Street of Kapłań

- Location within Poland
- Coordinates: 52°47′02″N 22°27′52″E
- Country: Poland
- Voivodeship: Podlaskie
- County: Wysokie Mazowieckie
- Gmina: Klukowo

Kapłań [ˈkapwaɲ] is a village in the administrative district of Gmina Klukowo, within Wysokie Mazowieckie County, Podlaskie Voivodeship, in north-eastern Poland.
