= Dmochy-Rodzonki =

- Village
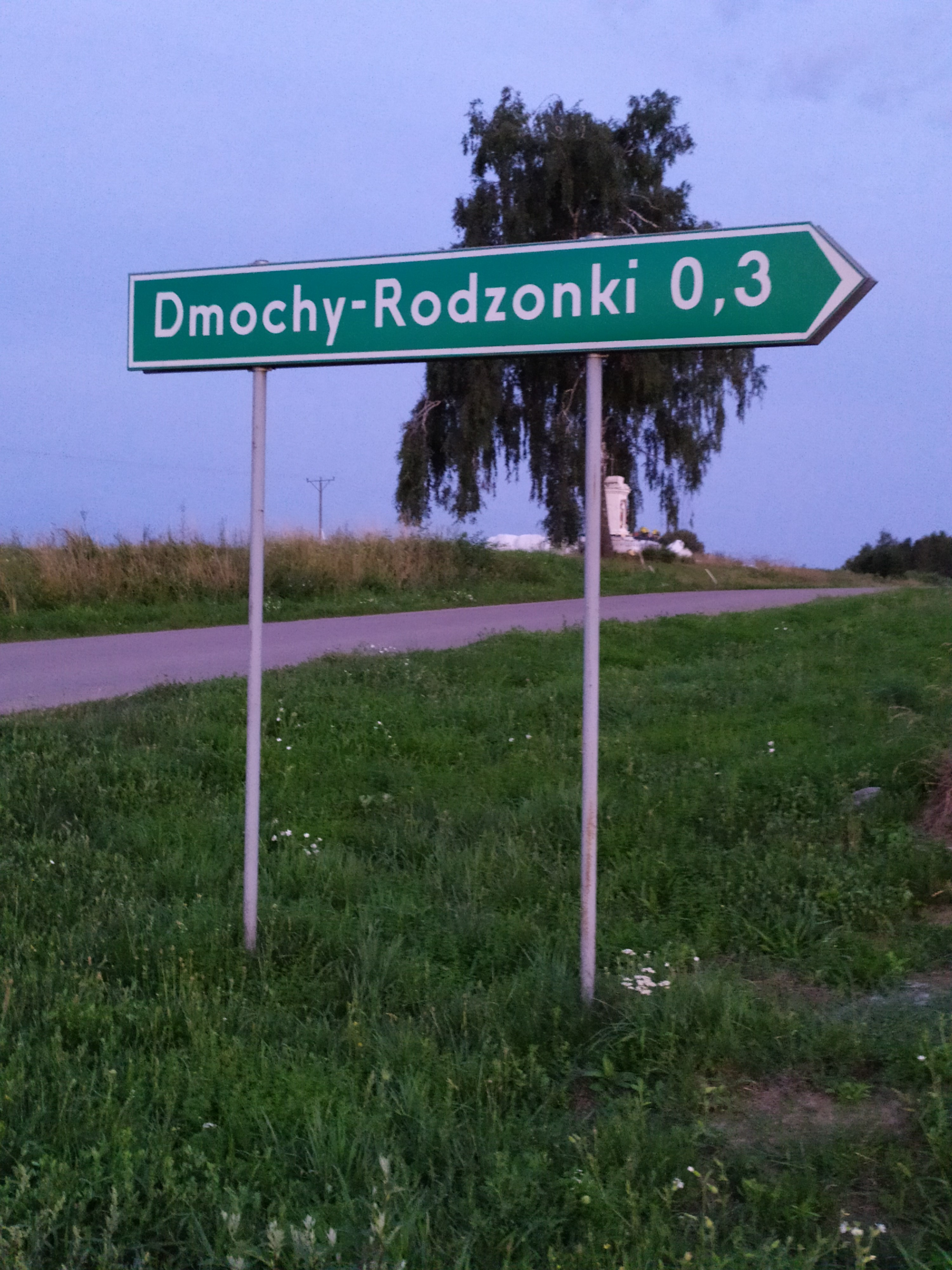
- Flag

- Location within Poland
- Coordinates: 52°49′14″N 22°19′55″E
- Country: Poland
- Voivodeship: Podlaskie
- County: Wysokie Mazowieckie
- Gmina: Czyżew-Osada

Dmochy-Rodzonki [ˈdmɔxɨ rɔˈd͡zɔnki] is a village in the administrative district of Gmina Czyżew-Osada, within Wysokie Mazowieckie County, Podlaskie Voivodeship, in north-eastern Poland.
