= Siennica-Szymanki =

- Village
- Location within Poland
- Coordinates: 52°48′12″N 22°26′08″E
- Country: Poland
- Voivodeship: Podlaskie
- County: Wysokie Mazowieckie
- Gmina: Czyżew-Osada
- Postal code: 18-220
- Vehicle registration: BWM

Siennica-Szymanki (Polish pronunciation: [ɕɛnˈnit͡sa ʂɨˈmaŋkʲi]) is a village in the administrative district of Gmina Czyżew-Osada, within Wysokie Mazowieckie County, Podlaskie Voivodeship, in north-eastern Poland.

Five Polish citizens were murdered by Nazi Germany in the village during World War II.
