= Godlewo-Piętaki =

- Village
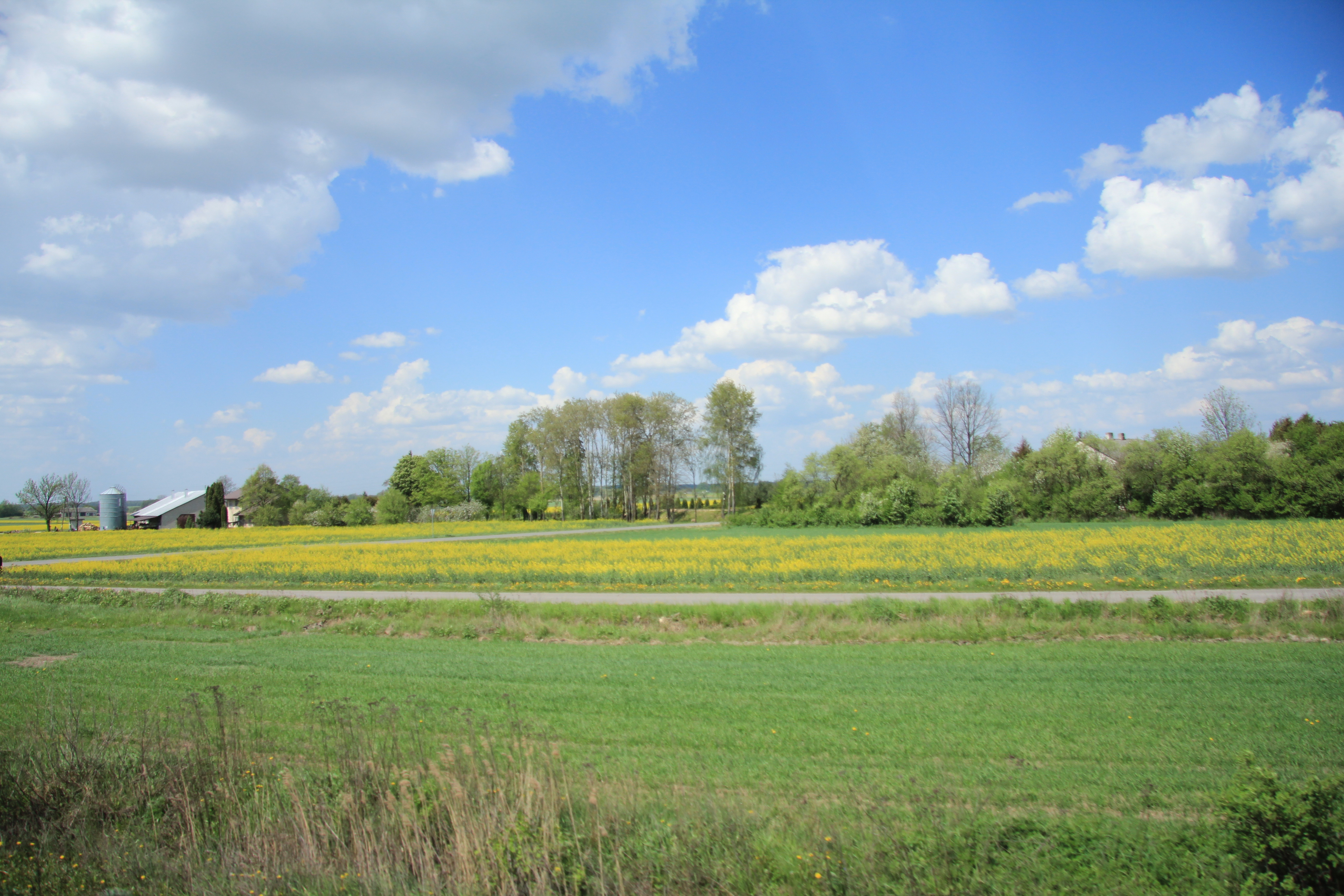

- Location within Poland
- Coordinates: 52°48′08″N 22°23′06″E
- Country: Poland
- Voivodeship: Podlaskie
- County: Wysokie Mazowieckie
- Gmina: Czyżew-Osada

Godlewo-Piętaki [ɡɔdˈlɛvɔ pjɛnˈtaki] is a village in the administrative district of Gmina Czyżew-Osada, within Wysokie Mazowieckie County, Podlaskie Voivodeship, in north-eastern Poland.
