= Zaręby-Święchy =

- Village
- Location within Poland
- Coordinates: 52°51′52″N 22°18′25″E
- Country: Poland
- Voivodeship: Podlaskie
- County: Wysokie Mazowieckie
- Gmina: Czyżew-Osada

Zaręby-Święchy (Polish pronunciation: [zaˈrɛmbɨ ˈɕfjɛ̃xɨ]) is a village in the administrative district of Gmina Czyżew-Osada, within Wysokie Mazowieckie County, Podlaskie Voivodeship, in north-eastern Poland.
