= Višinskis =

- Lithuanian surname
- m.: Višinskis
- f.: (unmarried): Višinskytė
- f.: (married): Višinskienė
- Origin: Lithuanized Polish surname
- Related names: Polish: Wyszyński; Russian: Vyshinsky

Višinskis is a Lithuanian family name. It may refer to:

- Povilas Višinskis, a Lithuanian writer, journalist, theatre director, and politician
- Rasmutis Višinskis, a Soviet Lithuanian 1980 Olympic canoer
