= Vyshinsky (surname) =

Vyshinsky (Russian: Выши́нский, Ukrainian: Вишинський) is the Russian and Ukrainian form of the Polish family name Wyszyński. It corresponds with the Lithuanian name Višinskis. Notable people with the surname include:

- Andrey Yanuaryevich Vyshinsky (1883–1953), Soviet politician, jurist and diplomat
- Kirill Valeryevich Vyshinsky (1967–2025), Ukrainian and Russian journalist
