= Zamastochcha, Minsk district =

Agrotown in Minsk Region, Belarus

Zamastochcha Замасточча (Belarusian) Замосточье (Russian)
- Agrotown
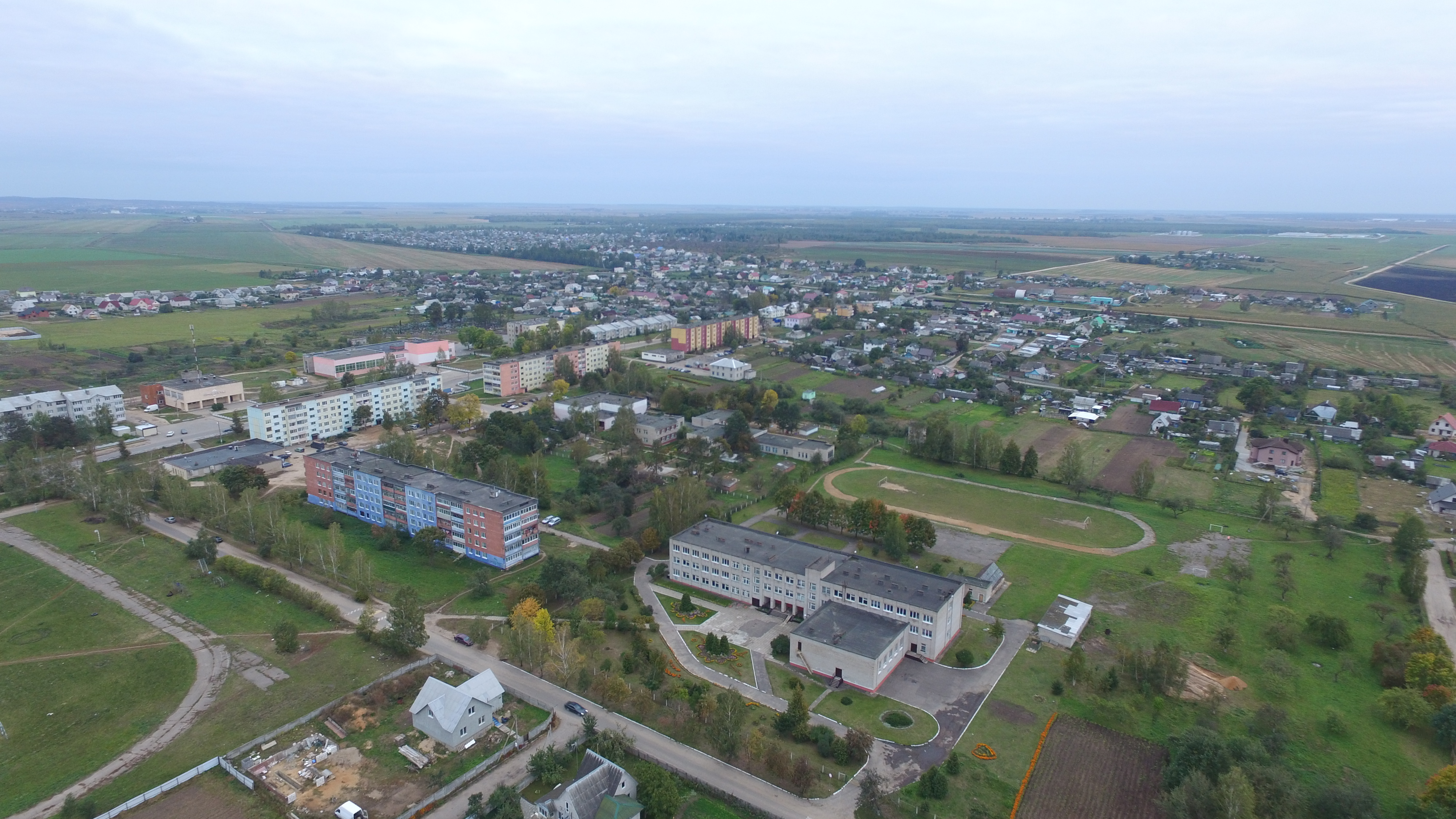

- Location within Belarus
- Coordinates: 53°49′15″N 27°51′59″E
- Country: Belarus
- Region: Minsk Region
- District: Minsk District
- Elevation: 190 m (620 ft)

Population (1997)
  - Total: 1,953
- Time zone: UTC+3 (MSK)
- Postal code: 223064
- Area code: +375 17
- License plate: 5

Zamastochcha (Belarusian: Замасточча, romanized: Zamastočča; Russian: Замосточье, romanized: Zamostochye) is an agrotown in Minsk District, Minsk Region, Belarus. It is administratively part of Luhavaya Slabada selsoviet. It is located 20 kilometres (12 mi) southeast of the capital Minsk. In 1997, it had a population of 1,953.

== History ==
Zamostocze, as it was known in Polish, was an okolica szlachecka, owned by various Polish noble families, including the Ancielewski, Konstantynowicz, Mazurkiewicz, Pawłowicz, Rzeczycki, Suchocki, Janczewski, Narejko and Płatowski families.
