= Siennica-Święchy =

- Village
- Location within Poland
- Coordinates: 52°48′40″N 22°25′01″E
- Country: Poland
- Voivodeship: Podlaskie
- County: Wysokie Mazowieckie
- Gmina: Czyżew-Osada
- Postal code: 18-220
- Vehicle registration: BWM

Siennica-Święchy (Polish pronunciation: [ɕɛnˈɲit͡sa ˈɕfjɛ̃xɨ]) is a village in the administrative district of Gmina Czyżew-Osada, within Wysokie Mazowieckie County, Podlaskie Voivodeship, in north-eastern Poland.
