= Święck-Strumiany =

- Village
- Location within Poland
- Coordinates: 52°53′N 22°24′E
- Country: Poland
- Voivodeship: Podlaskie
- County: Wysokie Mazowieckie
- Gmina: Czyżew-Osada

Święck-Strumiany (Polish pronunciation: [ˈɕfjɛnt͡sk struˈmjanɨ]) is a village in the administrative district of Gmina Czyżew-Osada, within Wysokie Mazowieckie County, Podlaskie Voivodeship, in north-eastern Poland.
