= Siennica-Klawy =

- Village
- Location within Poland
- Coordinates: 52°48′01″N 22°22′56″E
- Country: Poland
- Voivodeship: Podlaskie
- County: Wysokie Mazowieckie
- Gmina: Czyżew-Osada
- Postal code: 18-220
- Vehicle registration: BWM

Siennica-Klawy [ɕɛnˈnit͡sa ˈklavɨ] is a village in the administrative district of Gmina Czyżew-Osada, within Wysokie Mazowieckie County, Podlaskie Voivodeship, in north-eastern Poland.
