= Krzeczkowo-Szepielaki =

- Village
- Location within Poland
- Coordinates: 52°49′47″N 22°20′01″E
- Country: Poland
- Voivodeship: Podlaskie
- County: Wysokie Mazowieckie
- Gmina: Czyżew-Osada

Krzeczkowo-Szepielaki [kʂɛt͡ʂˈkɔvɔ ʂɛpjɛˈlaki] is a village in the administrative district of Gmina Czyżew-Osada, within Wysokie Mazowieckie County, Podlaskie Voivodeship, in north-eastern Poland.
