= Żebry Wielkie =

- Village
- Location within Poland
- Coordinates: 52°43′N 22°30′E
- Country: Poland
- Voivodeship: Podlaskie
- County: Wysokie Mazowieckie
- Gmina: Klukowo
- Population: 88

Żebry Wielkie [ˈʐɛbrɨ ˈvjɛlkʲɛ] is a village in the administrative district of Gmina Klukowo, within Wysokie Mazowieckie County, Podlaskie Voivodeship, in north-eastern Poland.
