= Dąbrowa-Nowa Wieś =

Village in Gmina Czyżew-Osada, Poland

- Village
- Location within Poland
- Coordinates: 52°48′55″N 22°27′12″E
- Country: Poland
- Voivodeship: Podlaskie
- County: Wysokie Mazowieckie
- Gmina: Czyżew-Osada
- Postal code: 18-220
- Vehicle registration: BWM

Dąbrowa-Nowa Wieś [dɔmˈbrɔva ˈnɔva ˈvjɛɕ] is a village in the administrative district of Gmina Czyżew-Osada, within Wysokie Mazowieckie County, Podlaskie Voivodeship, in north-eastern Poland.

45 Polish citizens were murdered by Nazi Germany in the village during World War II.
