= Wyszyński =

Wyszyński (feminine: Wyszyńska; plural: Wyszyńscy) is a noble Polish family name (coat of arms: Pierzchała, Sas, Trzywdar). It has 7–8 thousand bearers. Its nest is okolica szlachecka (zaścianek) Wyszonki in Podlasie. It corresponds to the Lithuanian Višinskis and Russian Vyshinsky and may be Anglicized as Wyshynski.

The surname may refer to:

- Adam Wyszyński (born 1993), Polish model, journalist and Mister Poland 2025
- Julia Wyszyńska (born 1986), Polish actress
- Stefan Wyszyński (1901–1981), Polish cardinal
- Marek Wyszyński, Polish business executive

== See also ==
- Nowawieś Wyszyńska
