= Usza Wielka =

Usza Wielka, Poland
- Village
- Location within Poland
- Coordinates: 52°43′N 22°28′E
- Country: Poland
- Voivodeship: Podlaskie
- County: Wysokie Mazowieckie
- Gmina: Klukowo
- Elevation: 125 m (410 ft)
- Population (approx.): 120

Usza Wielka [ˈuʂa ˈvjɛlka] is a village in the administrative district of Gmina Klukowo, within Wysokie Mazowieckie County, Podlaskie Voivodeship, in north-eastern Poland.
