= Lubowicz-Kąty =

- Village
- Location within Poland
- Coordinates: 52°45′58″N 22°32′36″E
- Country: Poland
- Voivodeship: Podlaskie
- County: Wysokie Mazowieckie
- Gmina: Klukowo

Lubowicz-Kąty [luˈbɔvit͡ʂ ˈkɔntɨ] is a village in the administrative district of Gmina Klukowo, within Wysokie Mazowieckie County, Podlaskie Voivodeship, in north-eastern Poland.
