= Dmochy-Mrozy =

- Village
- Location within Poland
- Coordinates: 52°50′5″N 22°15′53″E
- Country: Poland
- Voivodeship: Podlaskie
- County: Wysokie Mazowieckie
- Gmina: Czyżew-Osada
- Elevation: 57 m (187 ft)

Dmochy-Mrozy [ˈdmɔxɨ ˈmrɔzɨ] is a village in the administrative district of Gmina Czyżew-Osada, within Wysokie Mazowieckie County, Podlaskie Voivodeship, in north-eastern Poland.
