= Żabiniec, Podlaskie Voivodeship =

Żabiniec
- Village
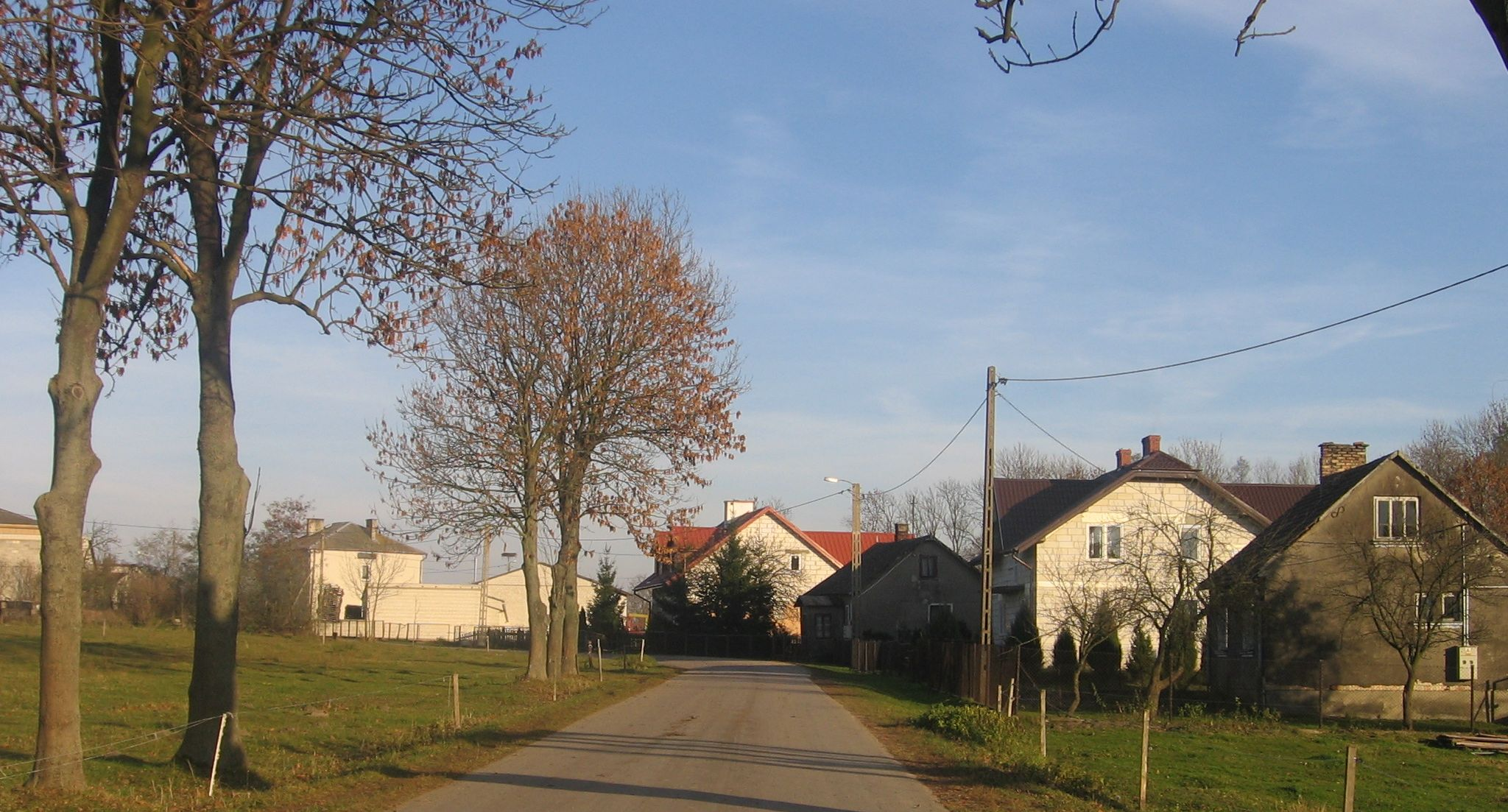
- Street of Żabiniec, Podlaskie Voivodeship

- Location within Poland
- Coordinates: 52°48′02″N 22°30′21″E
- Country: Poland
- Voivodeship: Podlaskie
- County: Wysokie Mazowieckie
- Gmina: Klukowo

Żabiniec [ʐaˈbiɲɛt͡s] is a village in the administrative district of Gmina Klukowo, within Wysokie Mazowieckie County, Podlaskie Voivodeship, in north-eastern Poland.
