= Dąbrowa Wielka, Podlaskie Voivodeship =

Dąbrowa Wielka
- Village
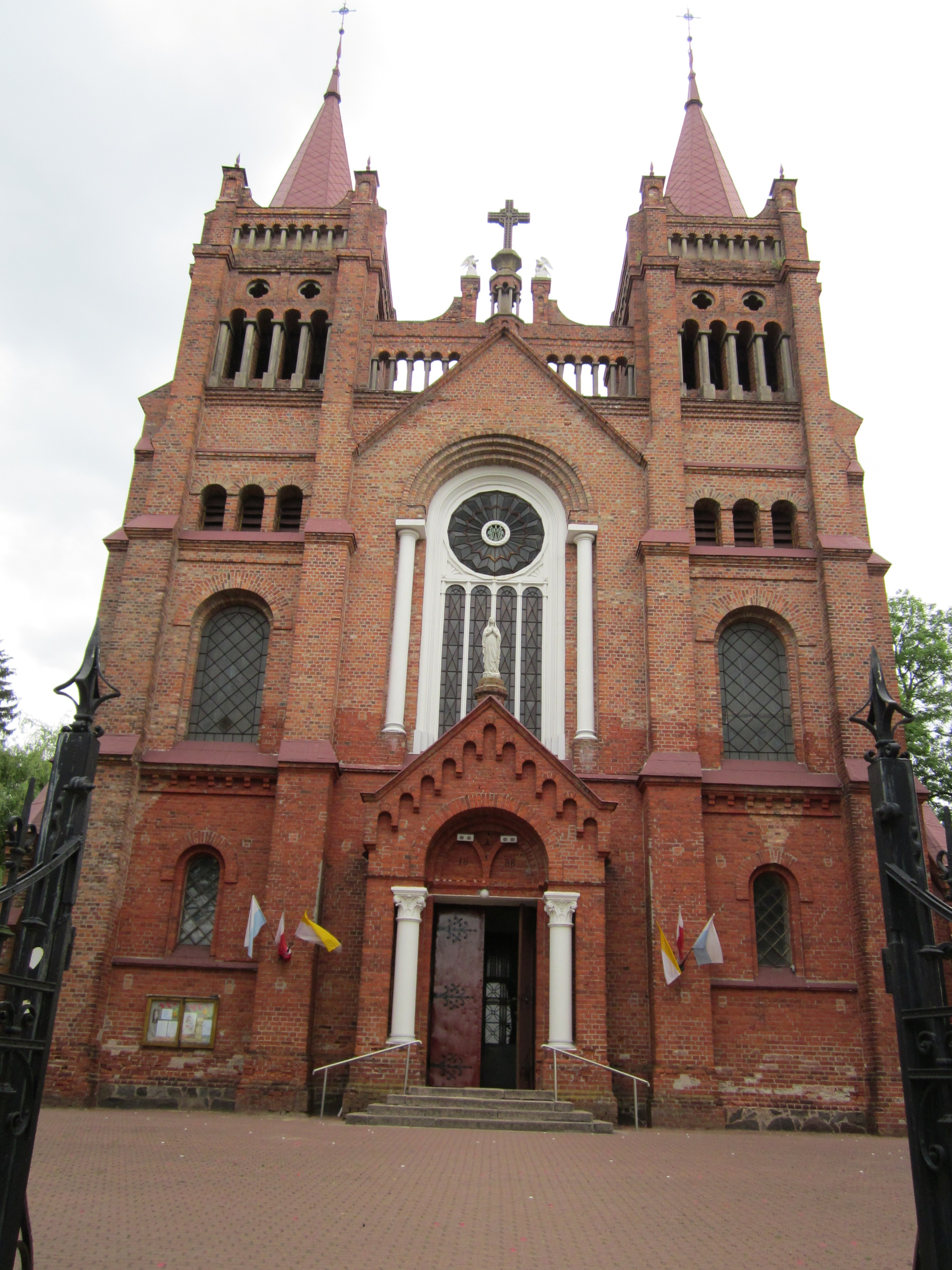
- Saint Stanislaus church in Dąbrowa Wielka

- Location within Poland
- Coordinates: 52°51′N 22°24′E
- Country: Poland
- Voivodeship: Podlaskie
- County: Wysokie Mazowieckie
- Gmina: Czyżew-Osada

Population
  - Total: 160
- Time zone: UTC+1 (CET)
  - Summer (DST): UTC+2 (CEST)
- Postal code: 18-220
- Vehicle registration: BWM

Dąbrowa Wielka [dɔmˈbrɔva ˈvjɛlka] is a village in the administrative district of Gmina Czyżew-Osada, within Wysokie Mazowieckie County, Podlaskie Voivodeship, in north-eastern Poland.

18 Polish citizens were murdered by Nazi Germany in the village during World War II.
