= Krzeczkowo-Gromadzyn =

- Village
- Location within Poland
- Coordinates: 52°50′N 22°20′E
- Country: Poland
- Voivodeship: Podlaskie
- County: Wysokie Mazowieckie
- Gmina: Czyżew-Osada

Krzeczkowo-Gromadzyn [kʂɛt͡ʂˈkɔvɔ ɡrɔˈmad͡zɨn] is a village in the administrative district of Gmina Czyżew-Osada, within Wysokie Mazowieckie County, Podlaskie Voivodeship, in north-eastern Poland.
