= Krzeczkowo-Mianowskie =

- Village
- Location within Poland
- Coordinates: 52°50′54″N 22°20′14″E
- Country: Poland
- Voivodeship: Podlaskie
- County: Wysokie Mazowieckie
- Gmina: Czyżew-Osada

Krzeczkowo-Mianowskie [kʂɛt͡ʂˈkɔvɔ mjaˈnɔfskʲɛ] is a village in the administrative district of Gmina Czyżew-Osada, within Wysokie Mazowieckie County, Podlaskie Voivodeship, in north-eastern Poland.
