= Rosochate Kościelne =

- Village
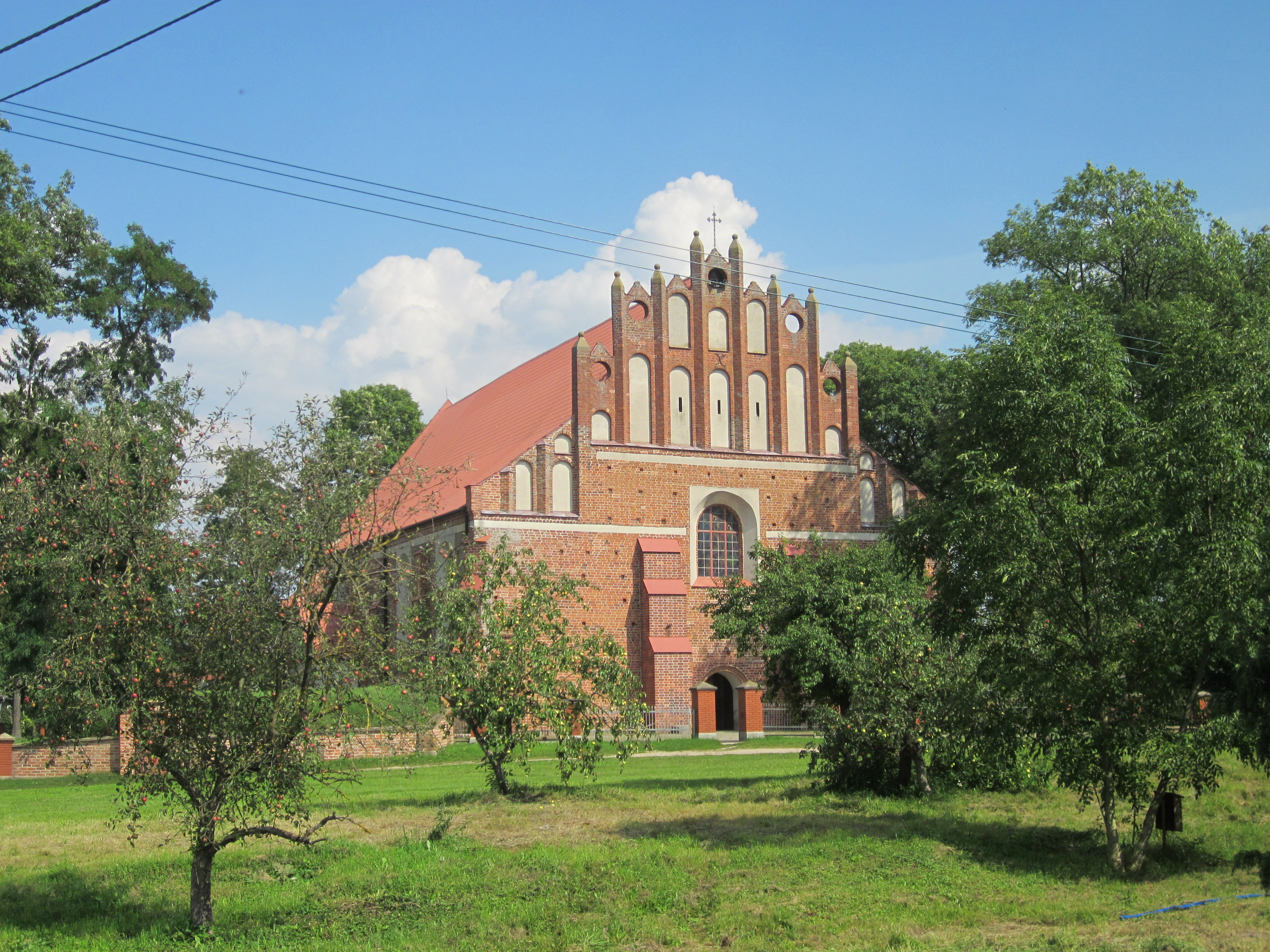
- Church of Saint Dorothy

- Location within Poland
- Coordinates: 52°52′N 22°21′E
- Country: Poland
- Voivodeship: Podlaskie
- County: Wysokie Mazowieckie
- Gmina: Czyżew-Osada

Population
  - Total: 350
- Postal code: 18-220
- Vehicle registration: BMN

Rosochate Kościelne [rɔsɔˈxatɛ kɔɕˈt͡ɕɛlnɛ] is a village in the administrative district of Gmina Czyżew-Osada, within Wysokie Mazowieckie County, Podlaskie Voivodeship, in north-eastern Poland.

Five Polish citizens were murdered by Nazi Germany in the village during World War II.
