= Trojanowo, Podlaskie Voivodeship =

Trojanowo
- Village
- Location within Poland
- Coordinates: 52°45′N 22°31′E
- Country: Poland
- Voivodeship: Podlaskie
- County: Wysokie Mazowieckie
- Gmina: Klukowo

Trojanowo [trɔjaˈnɔvɔ] is a village in the administrative district of Gmina Klukowo, within Wysokie Mazowieckie County, Podlaskie Voivodeship, in north-eastern Poland.
