= Stare Warele =

- Village
- Location within Poland
- Coordinates: 52°47′N 22°36′E
- Country: Poland
- Voivodeship: Podlaskie
- County: Wysokie Mazowieckie
- Gmina: Klukowo
- Population: 130

Stare Warele [ˈstarɛ vaˈrɛlɛ] is a village in the administrative district of Gmina Klukowo, within Wysokie Mazowieckie County, Podlaskie Voivodeship, in north-eastern Poland.
