= Czyżew-Chrapki =

- Village
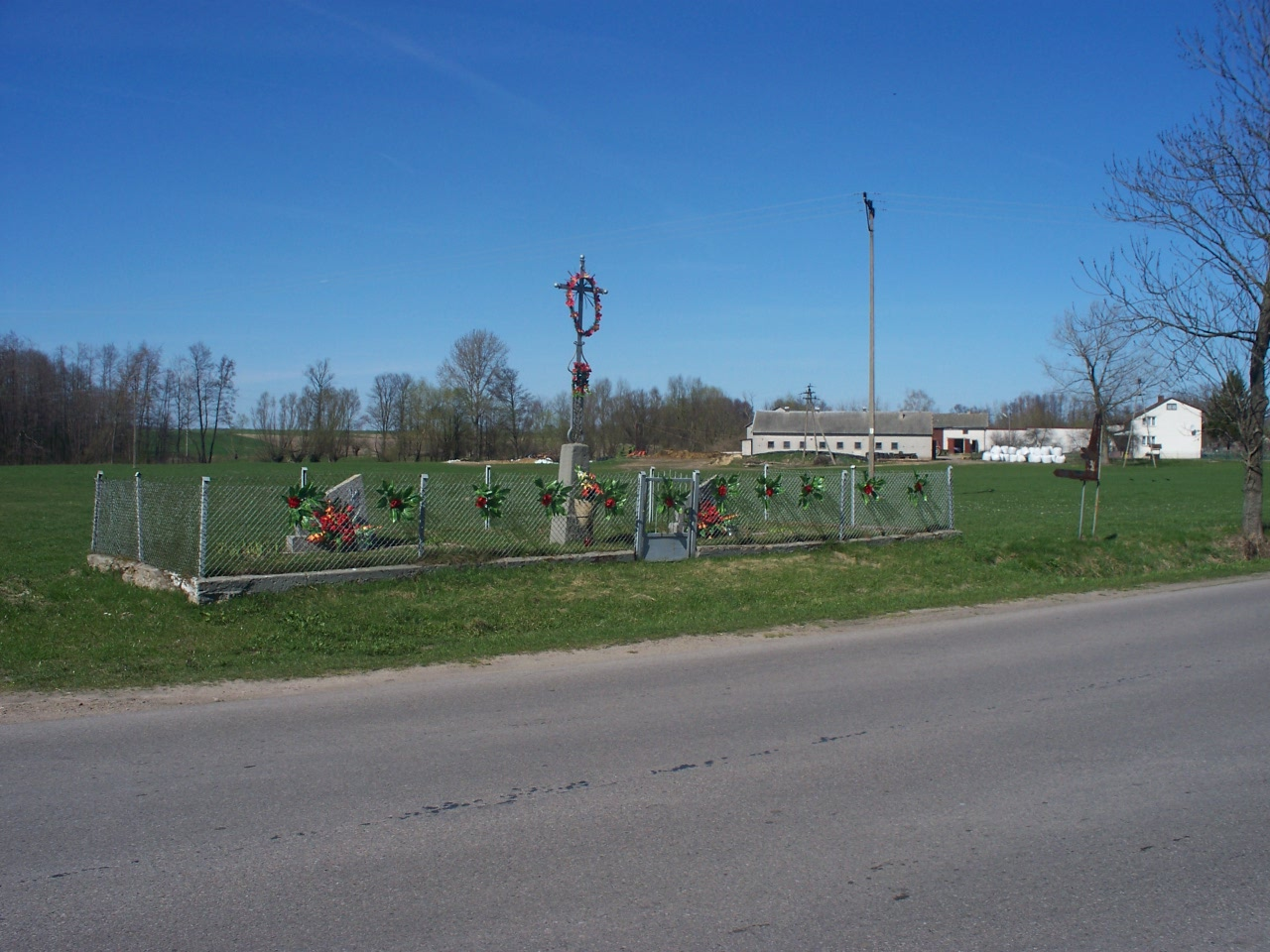
- Monument in Czyżew-Chrapki

- Location within Poland
- Coordinates: 52°48′10″N 22°18′59″E
- Country: Poland
- Voivodeship: Podlaskie
- County: Wysokie Mazowieckie
- Gmina: Czyżew-Osada
- Postal code: 18-220
- Vehicle registration: BWM

Czyżew-Chrapki [ˈt͡ʂɨʐɛf ˈxrapki] is a village in the administrative district of Gmina Czyżew-Osada, within Wysokie Mazowieckie County, Podlaskie Voivodeship, in north-eastern Poland.
