= Klukowo, Wysokie Mazowieckie County =

Klukowo
- Village
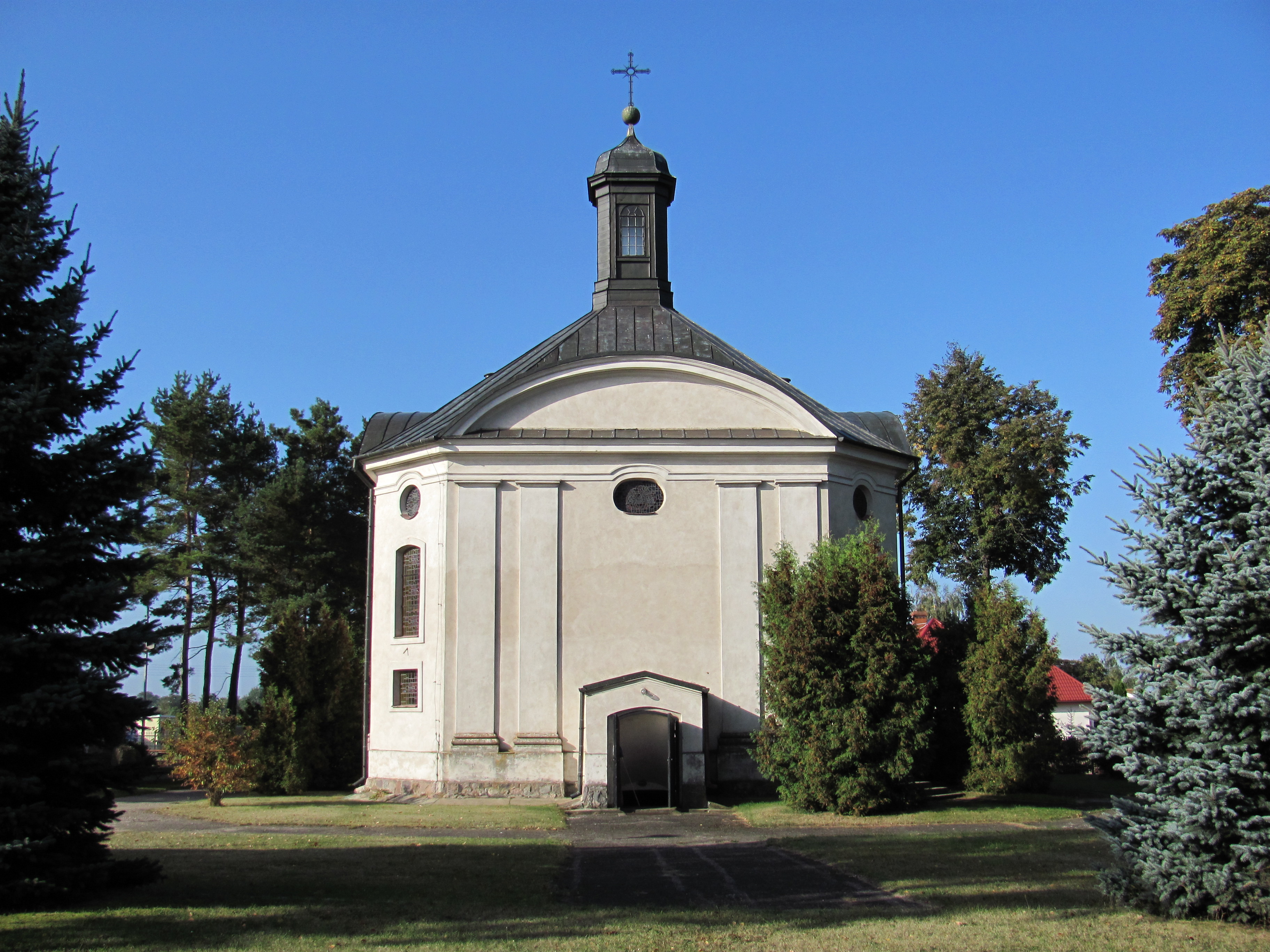
- Church of Saint Joseph

- Location within Poland
- Coordinates: 52°46′36″N 22°30′24″E
- Country: Poland
- Voivodeship: Podlaskie
- County: Wysokie Mazowieckie
- Gmina: Klukowo

Population
  - Total: 610
- Postal code: 18-214
- Vehicle registration: BWM

Klukowo [kluˈkɔvɔ] is a village in Wysokie Mazowieckie County, Podlaskie Voivodeship, in north-eastern Poland. It is the seat of the gmina (administrative district) called Gmina Klukowo.

Four Polish citizens were murdered by Nazi Germany in the village during World War II.
