= Lubowicz Wielki =

- Village
- Location within Poland
- Coordinates: 52°45′N 22°33′E
- Country: Poland
- Voivodeship: Podlaskie
- County: Wysokie Mazowieckie
- Gmina: Klukowo

Lubowicz Wielki (Polish pronunciation: [luˈbɔvitʂ ˈfjɛlkʲi]) is a village in the administrative district of Gmina Klukowo, within Wysokie Mazowieckie County, Podlaskie Voivodeship, in north-eastern Poland.
