= Stare Zalesie, Gmina Klukowo =

Stare Zalesie
- Village
- Location within Poland
- Coordinates: 52°46′N 22°36′E
- Country: Poland
- Voivodeship: Podlaskie
- County: Wysokie Mazowieckie
- Gmina: Klukowo
- Population: 70

Stare Zalesie [ˈstarɛ zaˈlɛɕɛ] is a village in the administrative district of Gmina Klukowo, within Wysokie Mazowieckie County, Podlaskie Voivodeship, in north-eastern Poland.
