= Wyszonki-Nagórki =

- Village
- Location within Poland
- Coordinates: 52°45′04″N 22°37′12″E
- Country: Poland
- Voivodeship: Podlaskie
- County: Wysokie Mazowieckie
- Gmina: Klukowo
- Postal code: 18-214
- Vehicle registration: BWM

Wyszonki-Nagórki [vɨˈʂɔŋki naˈɡurki] is a village in the administrative district of Gmina Klukowo, within Wysokie Mazowieckie County, Podlaskie Voivodeship, in north-eastern Poland.
