= Gmina Czyżew =

Gmina Czyżew Czyżew Commune
- Gmina
- Flag Coat of arms
- Interactive map of Gmina Czyżew
- Coordinates (Czyżew): 52°48′N 22°19′E
- Country: Poland
- Voivodeship: Podlaskie
- County: Wysokie Mazowieckie
- Seat: Czyżew

Area
  - Total: 123.4 km^{2} (47.6 sq mi)

Population (2013)
  - Total: 6,550
  - Density: 53.1/km^{2} (137/sq mi)
  - Urban: 2,636
  - Rural: 3,914
- Website: http://www.czyzewosada.pl/

Gmina Czyżew is an urban-rural gmina (administrative district) in Wysokie Mazowieckie County, Podlaskie Voivodeship, in north-eastern Poland. Its seat is the town of Czyżew, which lies approximately 19 kilometres (12 mi) south-west of Wysokie Mazowieckie and 67 km (42 mi) south-west of the regional capital Białystok.

The gmina covers an area of 123.4 square kilometres (47.6 sq mi), and as of 2006 its total population is 6,653. Prior to 2011 it was a rural gmina and was called Gmina Czyżew-Osada, with its seat in the village of Czyżew-Osada (now part of the town of Czyżew, which was created on 1 January 2011).

== Villages ==
Apart from the town of Czyżew, the gmina contains the villages and settlements of Brulino-Koski, Brulino-Piwki, Czyżew Kościelny, Czyżew Ruś-Kolonia, Czyżew Ruś-Wieś, Czyżew-Chrapki, Czyżew-Pociejewo, Czyżew-Siedliska, Czyżew-Sutki, Dąbrowa Wielka, Dąbrowa-Cherubiny, Dąbrowa-Kity, Dąbrowa-Michałki, Dąbrowa-Nowa Wieś, Dąbrowa-Szatanki, Dmochy-Glinki, Dmochy-Mrozy, Dmochy-Rodzonki, Dmochy-Wochy, Dmochy-Wypychy, Godlewo-Kolonia, Godlewo-Piętaki, Jaźwiny-Koczoty, Kaczyn-Herbasy, Krzeczkowo-Gromadzyn, Krzeczkowo-Mianowskie, Krzeczkowo-Nowe Bieńki, Krzeczkowo-Stare Bieńki, Krzeczkowo-Szepielaki, Michałowo Wielkie, Ołdaki-Magna Brok, Rosochate Kościelne, Rosochate Nartołty, Siennica-Klawy, Siennica-Lipusy, Siennica-Pietrasze, Siennica-Święchy, Siennica-Szymanki, Stare Zalesie, Stary Kaczyn, Stokowo-Szerszenie, Święck-Strumiany, Szulborze-Kozy, Zalesie-Stefanowo, Zaręby-Bindugi, Zaręby-Góry Leśne, Zaręby-Skórki and Zaręby-Święchy.

== Neighbouring gminas ==
Gmina Czyżew is bordered by the gminas of Andrzejewo, Boguty-Pianki, Klukowo, Nur, Szepietowo, Szulborze Wielkie, Wysokie Mazowieckie and Zambrów.
