= Wyszonki Kościelne =

- Village
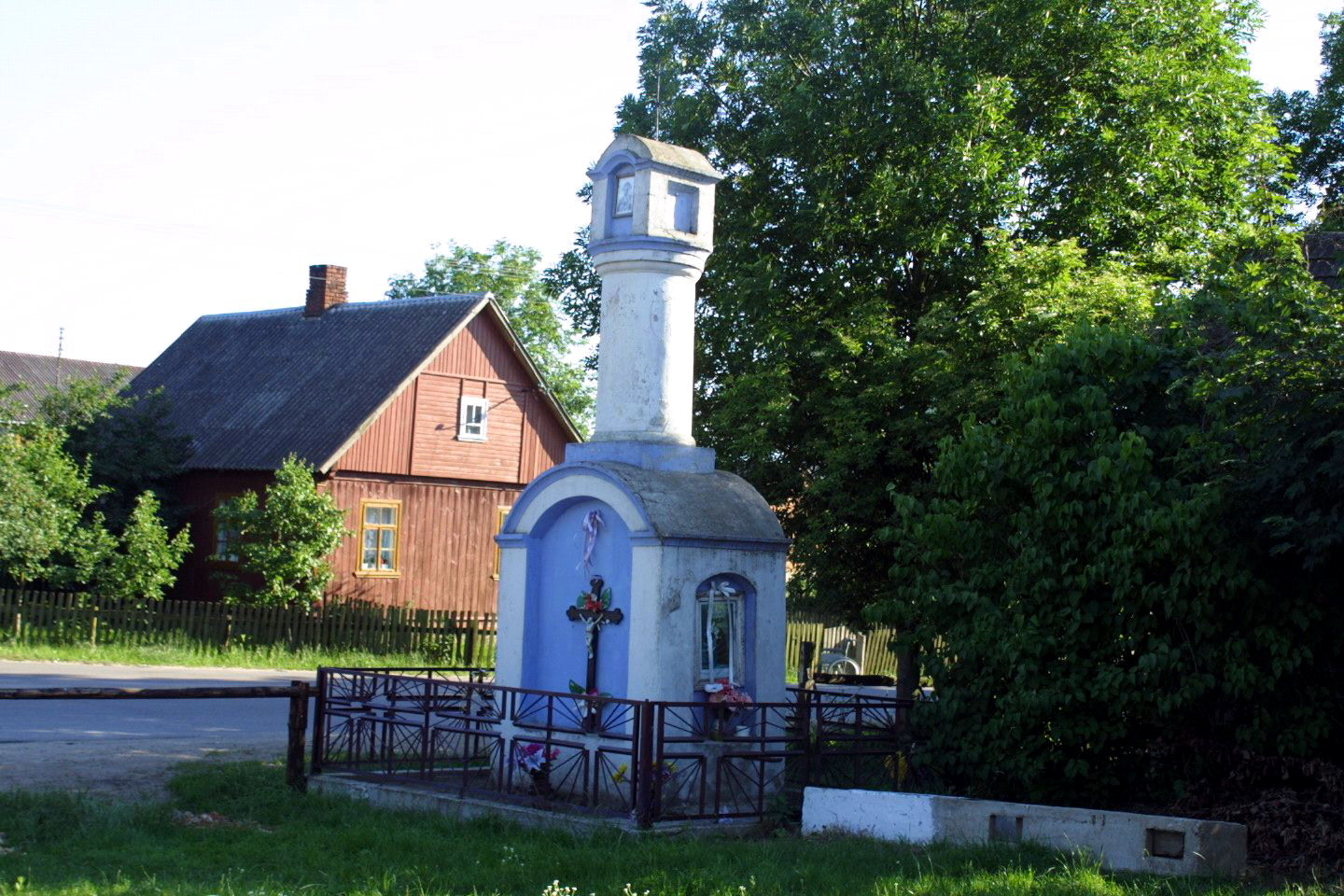

- Location within Poland
- Coordinates: 52°45′45″N 22°37′30″E
- Country: Poland
- Voivodeship: Podlaskie
- County: Wysokie Mazowieckie
- Gmina: Klukowo
- Postal code: 18-214
- Vehicle registration: BWM

Wyszonki Kościelne [vɨˈʂɔŋki kɔɕˈt͡ɕɛlnɛ] is a village in the administrative district of Gmina Klukowo, within Wysokie Mazowieckie County, Podlaskie Voivodeship, in north-eastern Poland.

Eleven Polish citizens were murdered by Nazi Germany in the village during World War II.
