= Kuczyn, Wysokie Mazowieckie County =

Kuczyn
- Village
- Location within Poland
- Coordinates: 52°42′50″N 22°31′47″E
- Country: Poland
- Voivodeship: Podlaskie
- County: Wysokie Mazowieckie
- Gmina: Klukowo
- Population: 350

Kuczyn [ˈkut͡ʂɨn] is a village in the administrative district of Gmina Klukowo, within Wysokie Mazowieckie County, Podlaskie Voivodeship, in north-eastern Poland.
