= Stare Zalesie, Gmina Czyżew-Osada =

Stare Zalesie
- Village
- Location within Poland
- Coordinates: 52°51′18″N 22°20′22″E
- Country: Poland
- Voivodeship: Podlaskie
- County: Wysokie Mazowieckie
- Gmina: Czyżew-Osada

Stare Zalesie [ˈstarɛ zaˈlɛɕɛ] is a village in the administrative district of Gmina Czyżew-Osada, within Wysokie Mazowieckie County, Podlaskie Voivodeship, in north-eastern Poland.
