= Dmochy-Glinki =

- Village
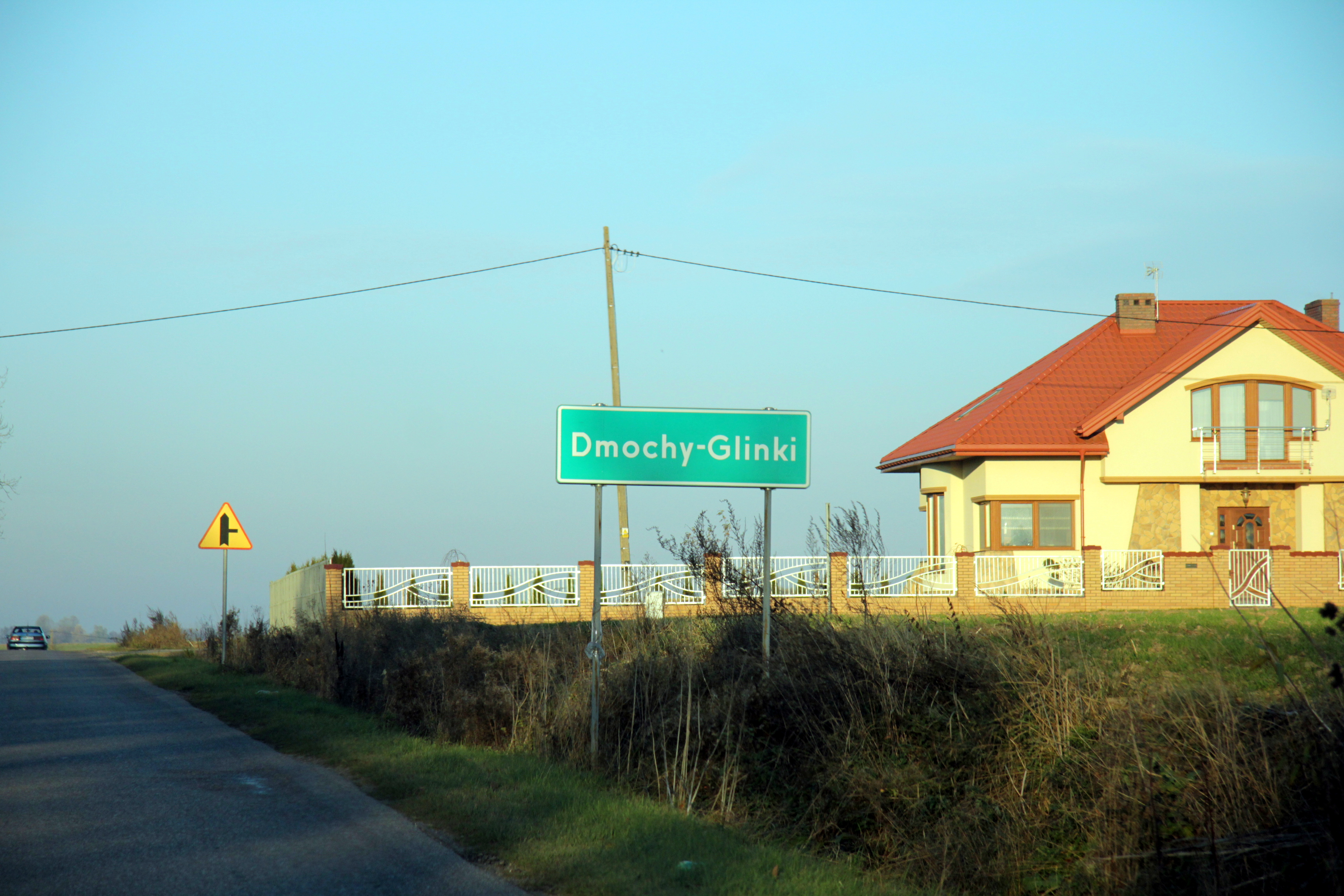

- Location within Poland
- Coordinates: 52°49′07″N 22°20′25″E
- Country: Poland
- Voivodeship: Podlaskie
- County: Wysokie Mazowieckie
- Gmina: Czyżew-Osada

Dmochy-Glinki [ˈdmɔxɨ ˈɡlinki] is a village in the administrative district of Gmina Czyżew-Osada, within Wysokie Mazowieckie County, Podlaskie Voivodeship, in north-eastern Poland.
