= Czyżew Kościelny =

- Village
- Location within Poland
- Coordinates: 52°48′N 22°19′E
- Country: Poland
- Voivodeship: Podlaskie
- County: Wysokie Mazowieckie
- Gmina: Czyżew-Osada

Population
  - Total: 4,000
- Postal code: 18-220
- Vehicle registration: BWM

Czyżew Kościelny [ˈt͡ʂɨʐɛf kɔɕˈt͡ɕɛlnɨ] is a village in the administrative district of Gmina Czyżew-Osada, within Wysokie Mazowieckie County, Podlaskie Voivodeship, in north-eastern Poland.
