= Czyżew =

- Town
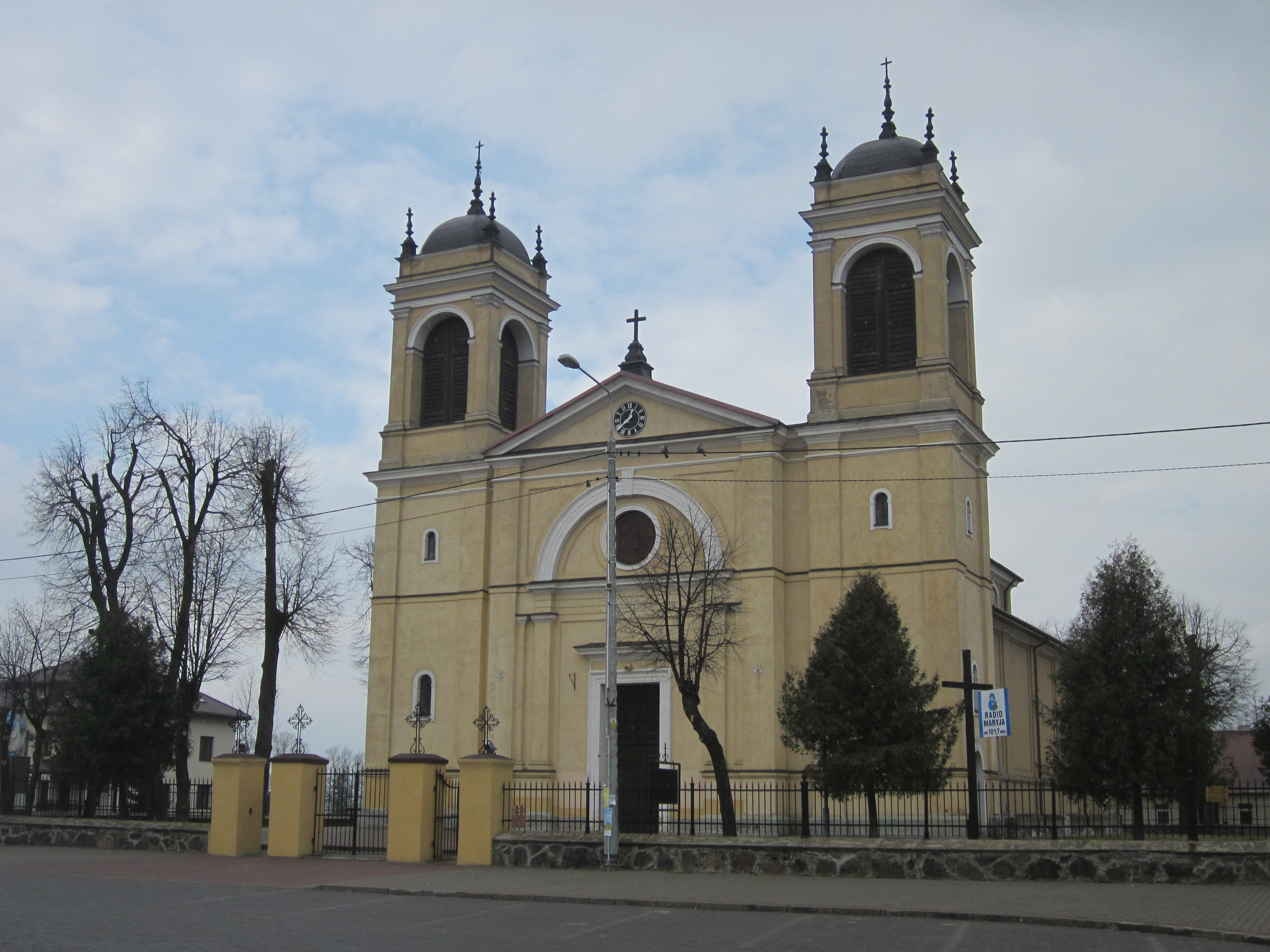
- Church of Saints Peter and Paul

- Flag Coat of arms

- Location within Poland
- Coordinates: 52°47′45″N 22°19′45″E
- Country: Poland
- Voivodeship: Podlaskie
- County: Wysokie Mazowieckie
- Gmina: Czyżew
- Town rights: 1713-1870, 2011

Government
  - Mayor: Franciszek Kuczewski

Area
  - Total: 5.23 km^{2} (2.02 sq mi)

Population (31 December 2021)
  - Total: 2,621
  - Density: 501/km^{2} (1,300/sq mi)
- Postal code: 18-220
- Area code: +48 86
- Car plates: BWM

Czyżew [ˈt͡ʂɨʐɛf] is a town in Wysokie Mazowieckie County, Podlaskie Voivodeship, in north-eastern Poland. It is the seat of the Gmina Czyżew administrative district. As of December 2021, the town had a population of 2,621.

== History ==
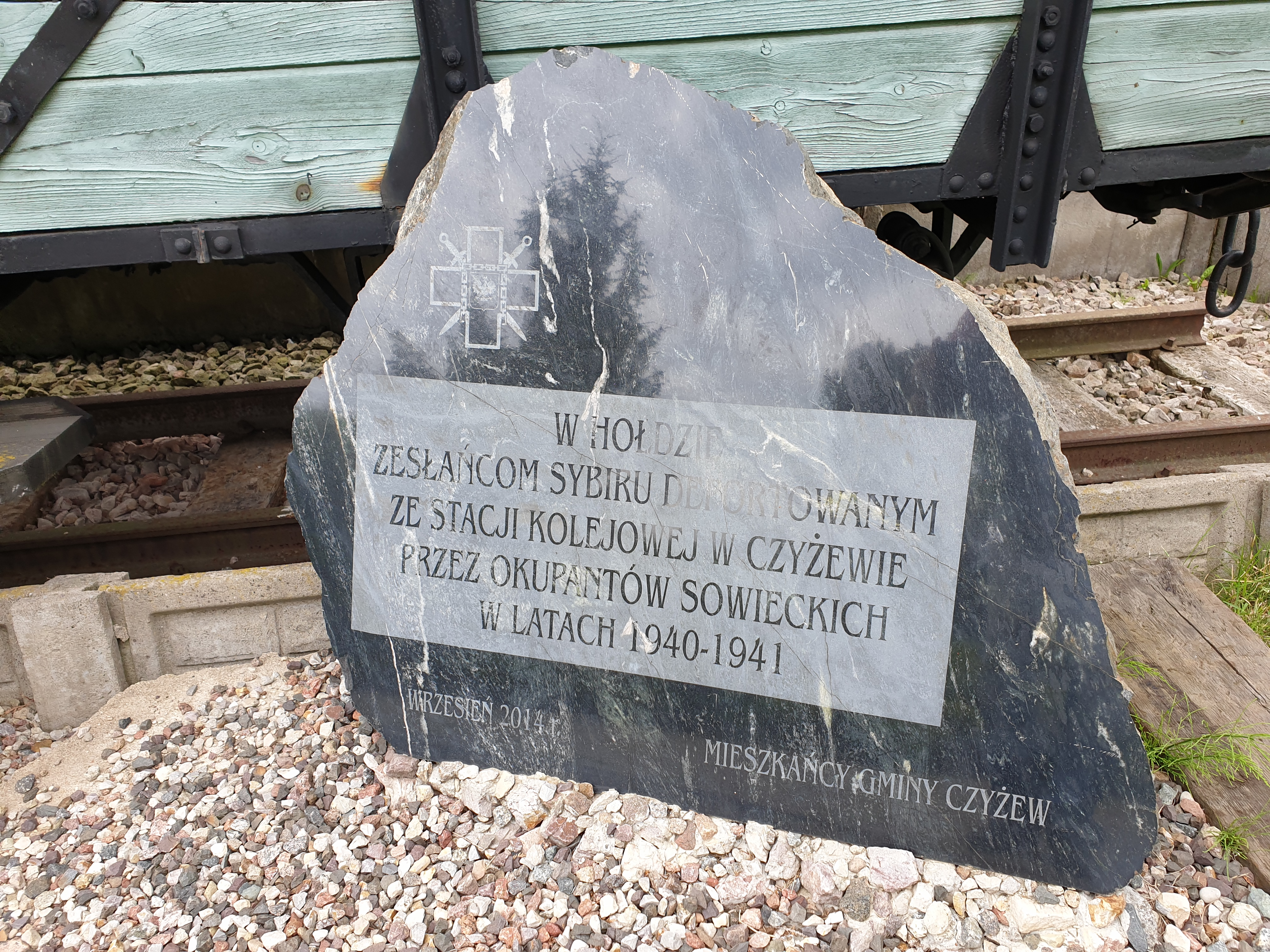
Monument to Poles deported by the Soviets from the local railway station to Siberia during World War II

About 1,600 Jews lived in the town prior to World War II, making up 85% of its population. The town was occupied by Nazi Germany in September 1939, and shortly thereafter given to the Soviets as part of the Molotov–Ribbentrop Pact. During this time, many Jewish refugees fled from areas under German control and resettled in Czyżew. A local Polish policeman was murdered by the Russians in the Katyn massacre in 1940. The Germans reoccupied Czyżew in June 1941, and most of the town's Jews were executed by firing squad in a nearby forest. One or two hundred professionals deemed relevant to the war effort were housed in a ghetto for forced labor, with the ghetto's residents later being transported to Zambrów and murdered.

Czyżew previously held town rights from 1738 to 1870; it became a town again on 1 January 2011. The town was re-formed from three villages: Czyżew-Osada ("settlement"), Czyżew-Złote Jabłko ("golden apple") and Czyżew-Stacja ("station"). On the same date the district was renamed from Gmina Czyżew-Osada to Gmina Czyżew.

== Transport ==
Czyżew lies on national road 63 which connects it to Zambrów and Siedlce.

The town has a station on the important Polish railway line no. 6, connecting Zielonka in the Warsaw metropolitan area with Białystok and Kuźnica.
