= Okolica szlachecka =

Estate village in Poland and Lithuania

In the history of Poland and Lithuania, okolica szlachecka (Lithuanian: akalyčia, akalica, bajorkaimis, Russian: околица, romanized: okolitsa) was a kind of estate village (neighbourhood of the nobility), or a complex of several villages of the same first part of the name and different second part. In the past, it was a single settlement, but later it was usually split, as the property has been divided into several inheritors. Such localities were usually inhabited by petty szlachta. They were common in the borderland of Mazovia and Podlachia in Poland and in central and north-west part of Lithuania. Many frequent toponymic (often noble) surnames are derived from their names.

== Examples ==
- Łapy (nowadays a town), the nest of Łapiński family
- Wyszonki, from where Wyszyński
- Zamostocze, now township

== See also ==
- Folwark
- Zaścianek
- Okolitsa
