= Szulborze-Kozy =

- Village
- Location within Poland
- Coordinates: 52°45′10″N 22°19′08″E
- Country: Poland
- Voivodeship: Podlaskie
- County: Wysokie Mazowieckie
- Gmina: Czyżew-Osada

Szulborze-Kozy [ʂulˈbɔʐɛ ˈkɔzɨ] is a village in the administrative district of Gmina Czyżew-Osada, within Wysokie Mazowieckie County, Podlaskie Voivodeship, in north-eastern Poland.
