= Nowe Osipy =

- Village
- Location within Poland
- Coordinates: 52°57′24″N 22°27′49″E
- Country: Poland
- Voivodeship: Podlaskie
- County: Wysokie Mazowieckie
- Gmina: Wysokie Mazowieckie
- Population: 35
- Postal code: 18-200
- Car plates: BWM

Nowe Osipy [ˈnɔvɛ ɔˈɕipɨ] is a village in the administrative district of Gmina Wysokie Mazowieckie, within Wysokie Mazowieckie County, Podlaskie Voivodeship, in northeastern Poland.

From 1975-1998, the village belonged administratively to Łomża Voivodeship.

The faithful of the Catholic Church belong to the parish of St John the Baptist in Wysokie Mazowieckie.

== History ==
At the time of the enfranchisement of the manorial land in Russia, in 1864 9 independent farms were established here on 128 morgens of land.

At the end of the 19th century, the village was in Wysokie Mazowieckie County, the municipality, and the parish of Wysokie. It comprised 9 settlements with arable land of 128 morgens.

In 1921, the village's 10 residential buildings and 77 inhabitants were counted. All declared Polish nationality and to be faithful in the Catholic faith.

From 1954 the village belonged to the Osipy-Kolonia district, then to the Wysokie Mazowieckie district and finally to the Wysokie Mazowieckie municipality.

== See also ==
- Stare Osipy
- Osipy-Kolonia
- Osipy-Zakrzewizna
- Osipy-Wydziory Pierwsze
- Osipy-Wydziory Drugie
- Osipy-Lepertowizna
