= Brzóski Brzezińskie =

Village in Gmina Wysokie Mazowieckie, Poland

- Village
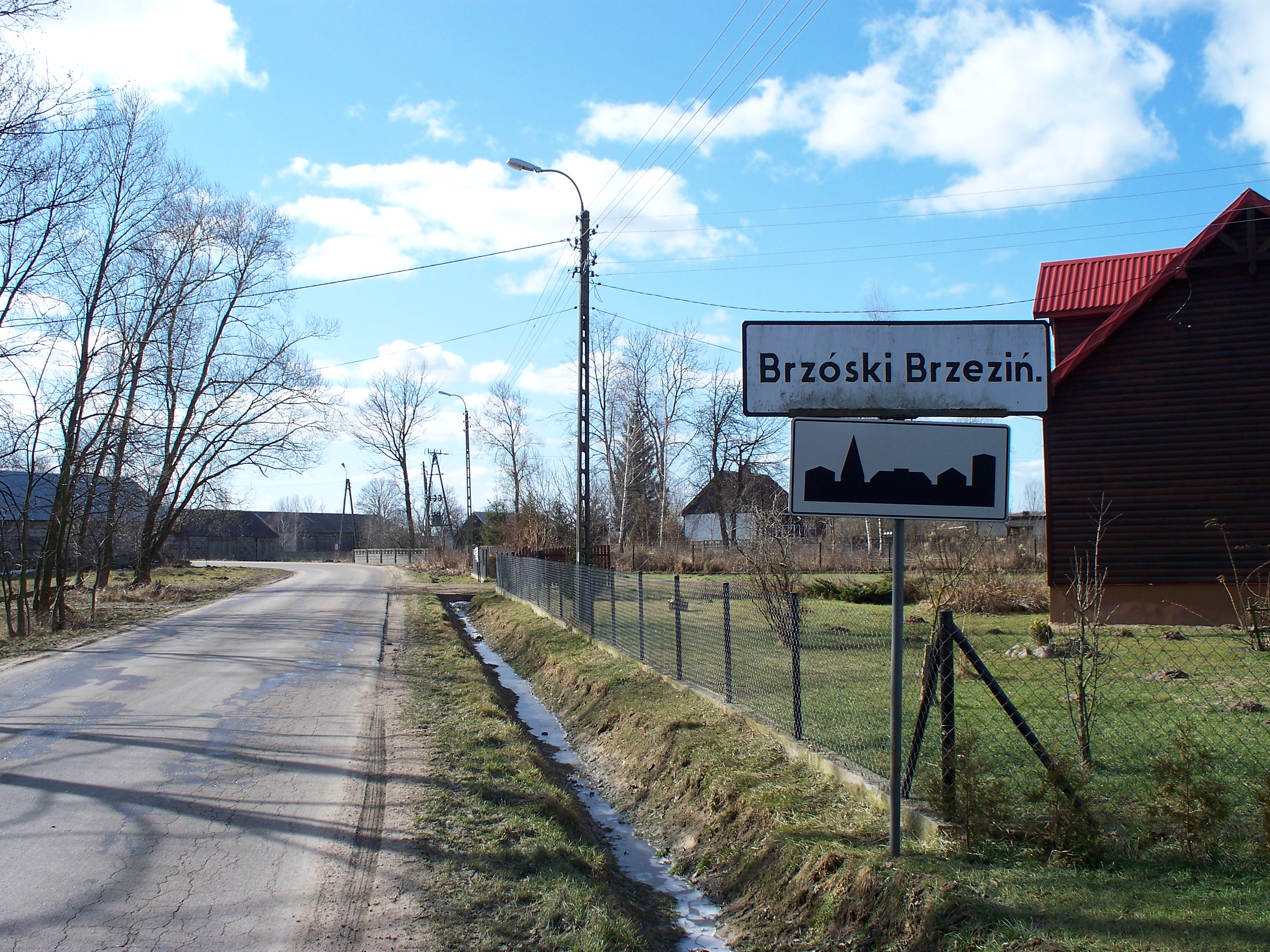

- Location within Poland
- Coordinates: 52°54′22″N 22°32′44″E
- Country: Poland
- Voivodeship: Podlaskie
- County: Wysokie Mazowieckie
- Gmina: Wysokie Mazowieckie
- Population: 125
- Postal code: 18-200
- Car plates: BWM

Brzóski Brzezińskie [ˈbʐuski bʐɛˈʑiɲskʲɛ] is a village in the administrative district of Gmina Wysokie Mazowieckie, within Wysokie Mazowieckie County, Podlaskie Voivodeship, in north-eastern Poland.

The village of Brzezinski was a petty noble village belonged to the area of Brzoski and it was located in the second half of the 17th century in the Bielski land of Bielsk Podlaski province. From 1975-1998, the village belonged administratively to Łomża Voivideship.

The faithful of the Roman Catholic Church belong to the parish of St Apostles Peter and Paul in Wysokie Mazowieckie.

The village is also the birthplace of Polish Catholic Priest, Historian and Theological teacher Witold Jemielity

== History ==
Nearby are several other villages named Brzóski, differing by the second part of the name. In the 19th century, these villages formed the nobleman's neighbourhood of Brzóski. Within its boundaries were: Brzóski-Gromki, Brzóski-Falki, Brzóski-Tatary, Brzóski-Gawrony and Brzóski-Brzezińskie. Polish Historian Zygmunt Gloger also mentions Brzóski-Jakubowięta, Brzóski-Markowięta (now Brzóski-Markowizna), Brzóski-Stanisławięta (now Brzóski-Stankowizna). The This area was the nest of the Brzoski family.

In the year 1827 the population of the village numbered at 159 people and 24 residential buildings.

At the end of the 19th century the village was in the district, municipality and parish of Wysokie Mazowieckie.

In 1921 there were 24 residential buildings in the village, 1 other inhabited building and 149 inhabitants. 136 people declared Polish nationality, 12 declared jews, other nationality by 1. Roman Catholicism was declared by 125 inhabitants, Orthodoxy by 2 and Mosaic religion by 22.

== Places of interest ==
- A World War I german cemetery
