= Litva =

Litva (Cyrillic: Литва) may refer to:

- The name of Lithuania in Russian, Czech, Croatian, and some other Slavic languages
- Litva, Brest Region, village in Belarus
- Litva, Kursk Oblast, village in Russia
- 2577 Litva, Mars-crossing asteroid

== See also ==
- Litwa (disambiguation)
