= Litwa (disambiguation) =

Litwa is the Polish name for Lithuania.

Litwa may also refer to:

- Litwa (newspaper), Polish-language periodical published in Vilnius in 1908–1914
- Miodusy-Litwa, a village in the administrative district of Gmina Wysokie Mazowieckie, Wysokie Mazowieckie County, Podlaskie Voivodeship, in north-eastern Poland
- Stara Litwa, a village in the administrative district of Gmina Kulesze Kościelne, Wysokie Mazowieckie County, Podlaskie Voivodeship, in north-eastern Poland
- Kostry-Litwa, a village in the administrative district of Gmina Nowe Piekuty, Wysokie Mazowieckie County, Podlaskie Voivodeship, in north-eastern Poland

== See also ==
- Litva (disambiguation)
