= Michałki, Podlaskie Voivodeship =

Michałki
- Village
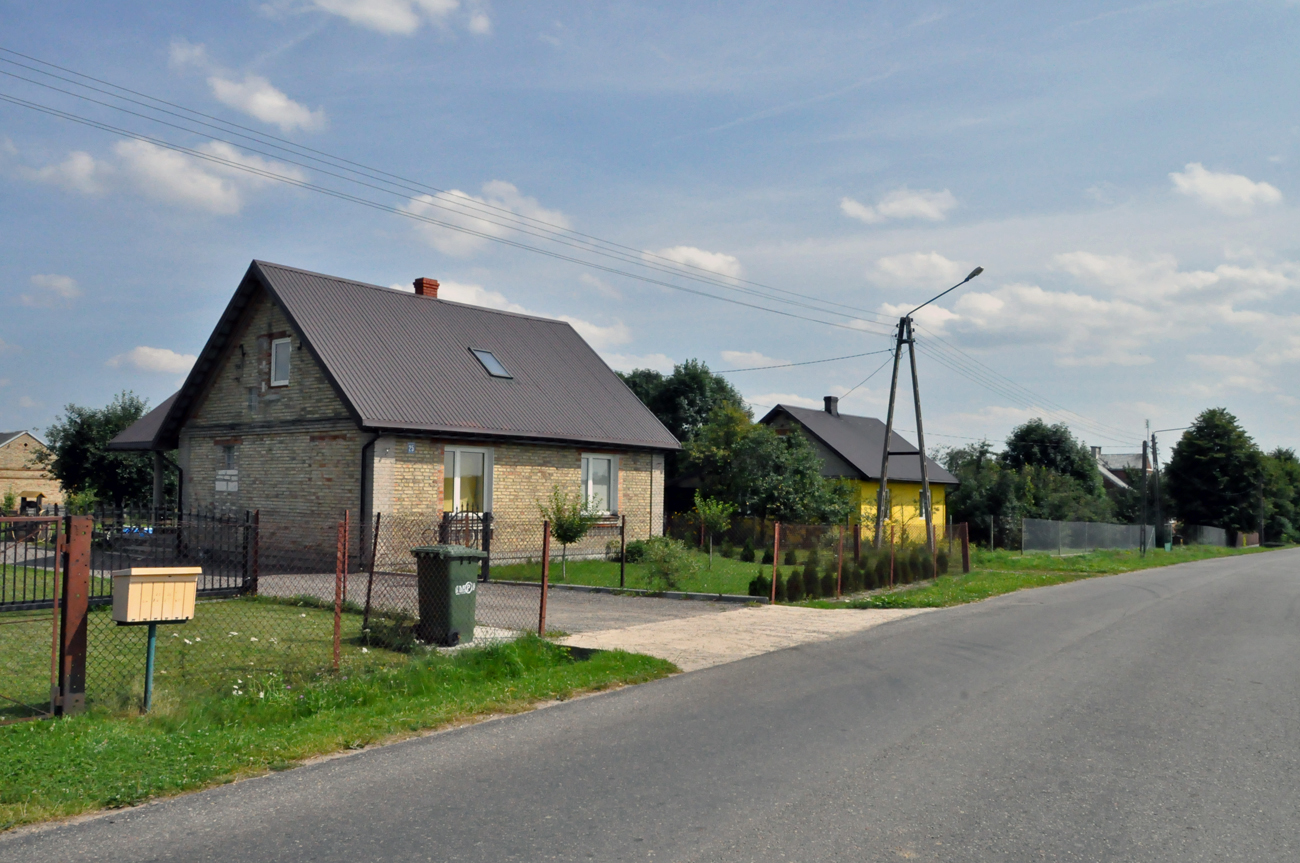
- Road in the village

- Location within Poland
- Coordinates: 52°54′51″N 22°28′39″E
- Country: Poland
- Voivodeship: Podlaskie
- County: Wysokie Mazowieckie
- Gmina: Wysokie Mazowieckie

Michałki (Polish pronunciation: [miˈxawkʲi]) is a village in the administrative district of Gmina Wysokie Mazowieckie, within Wysokie Mazowieckie County, Podlaskie Voivodeship, in north-eastern Poland.
