= Wólka Mała, Wysokie Mazowieckie County =

Wólka Mała
- Village
- Location within Poland
- Coordinates: 52°54′27″N 22°21′59″E
- Country: Poland
- Voivodeship: Podlaskie
- County: Wysokie Mazowieckie
- Gmina: Wysokie Mazowieckie

Wólka Mała [ˈvulka ˈmawa] is a village in the administrative district of Gmina Wysokie Mazowieckie, within Wysokie Mazowieckie County, Podlaskie Voivodeship, in north-eastern Poland.
