= Jabłoń-Rykacze =

- Village
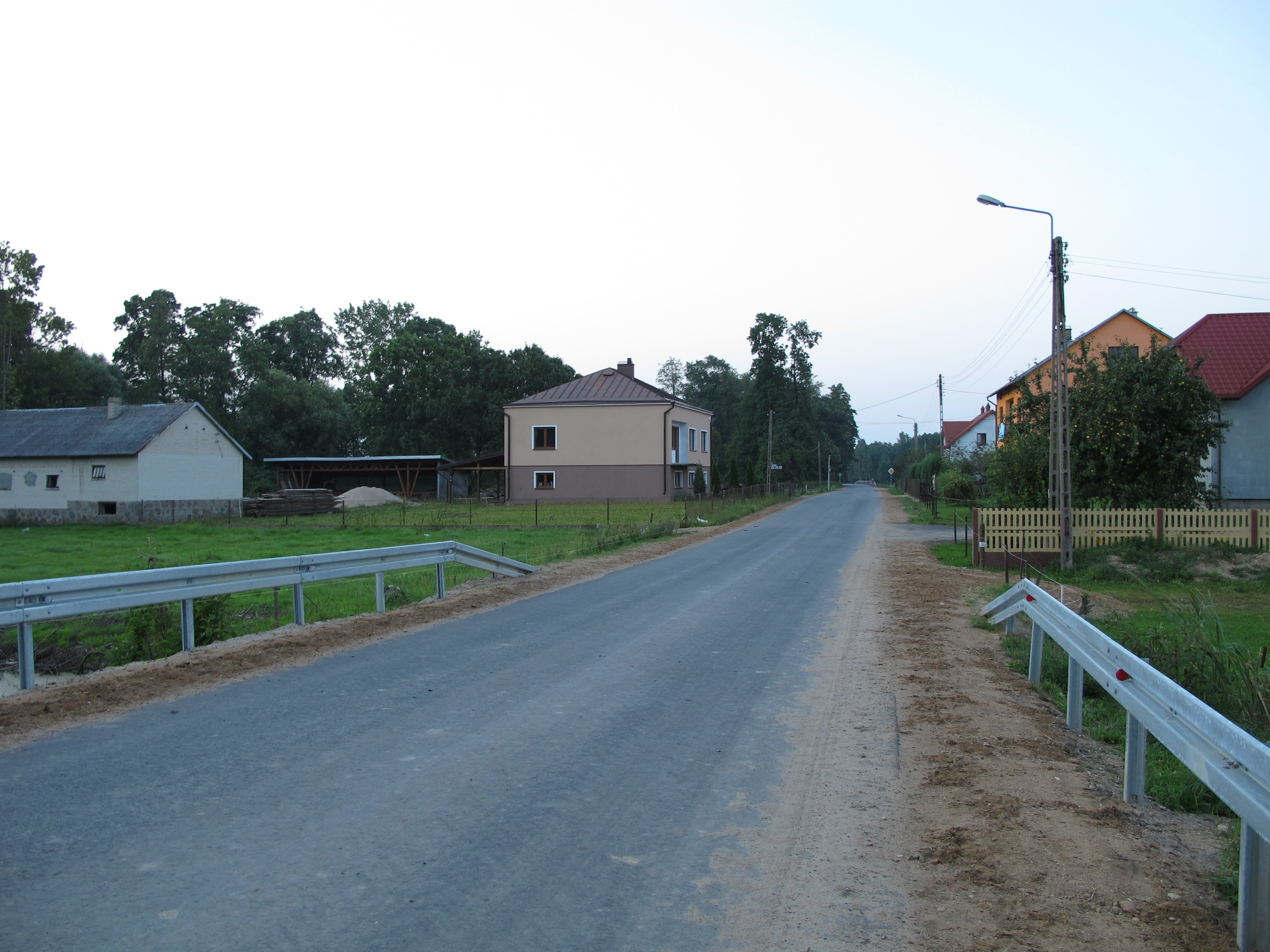
- Road in Jabłoń-Rykacze

- Location within Poland
- Coordinates: 52°56′49″N 22°39′00″E
- Country: Poland
- Voivodeship: Podlaskie
- County: Wysokie Mazowieckie
- Gmina: Wysokie Mazowieckie

Jabłoń-Rykacze [ˈjabwɔɲ rɨˈkat͡ʂɛ] is a village in the administrative district of Gmina Wysokie Mazowieckie, within Wysokie Mazowieckie County, Podlaskie Voivodeship, in north-eastern Poland.
