= Bujny-Biszewo =

- Village
- Location within Poland
- Coordinates: 52°57′26″N 22°38′44″E
- Country: Poland
- Voivodeship: Podlaskie
- County: Wysokie Mazowieckie
- Gmina: Wysokie Mazowieckie

Bujny-Biszewo (Polish pronunciation: [ˈbujnɨ biˈʂɛvɔ]) is a village in the administrative district of Gmina Wysokie Mazowieckie, within Wysokie Mazowieckie County, Podlaskie Voivodeship, in north-eastern Poland.
