= Święck-Nowiny =

- Village
- Location within Poland
- Coordinates: 52°54′58″N 22°24′18″E
- Country: Poland
- Voivodeship: Podlaskie
- County: Wysokie Mazowieckie
- Gmina: Wysokie Mazowieckie

Święck-Nowiny (Polish pronunciation: [ˈɕfjɛnt͡sk nɔˈvinɨ]) is a village in the administrative district of Gmina Wysokie Mazowieckie, within Wysokie Mazowieckie County, Podlaskie Voivodeship, in north-eastern Poland.
