= Gołasze-Puszcza =

Village in Gmina Wysokie Mazowieckie, Poland

- Village
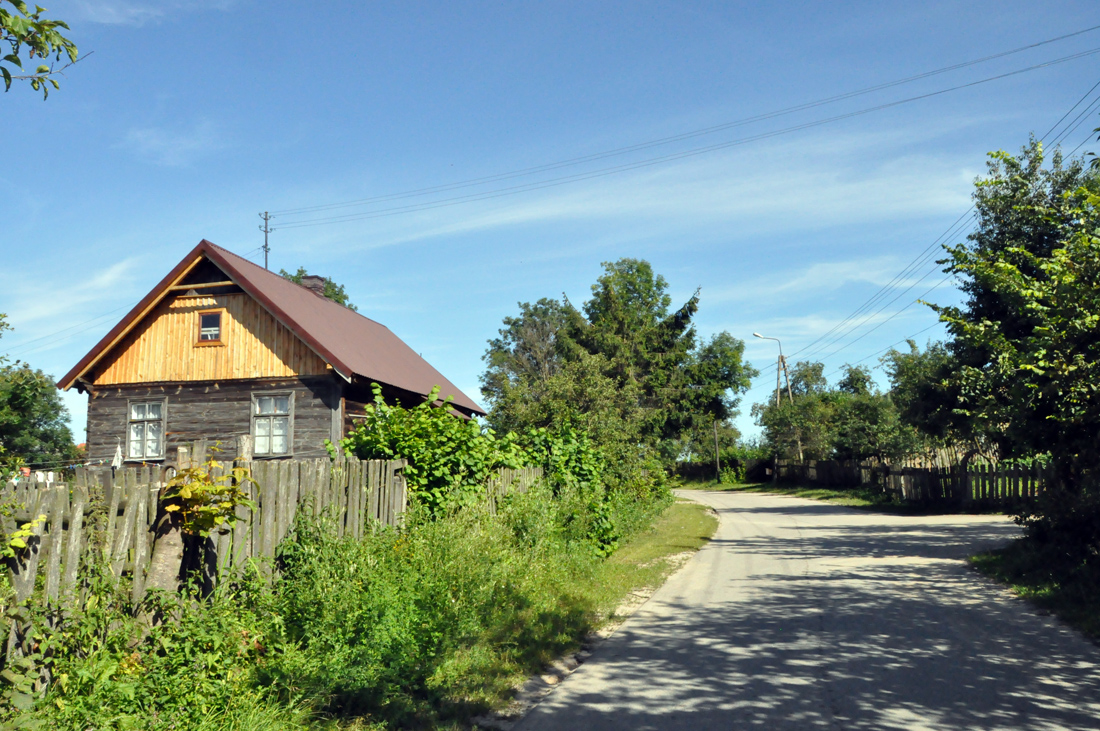
- View of the village

- Location within Poland
- Coordinates: 52°57′22″N 22°29′12″E
- Country: Poland
- Voivodeship: Podlaskie
- County: Wysokie Mazowieckie
- Gmina: Wysokie Mazowieckie

Gołasze-Puszcza [ɡɔˈwaʂɛ ˈpuʂt͡ʂa] is a village in the administrative district of Gmina Wysokie Mazowieckie, within Wysokie Mazowieckie County, Podlaskie Voivodeship, in north-eastern Poland.
