= Jabłoń-Uszyńskie =

Village in Gmina Wysokie Mazowieckie, Poland

- Village
- Location within Poland
- Coordinates: 52°56′05″N 22°37′36″E
- Country: Poland
- Voivodeship: Podlaskie
- County: Wysokie Mazowieckie
- Gmina: Wysokie Mazowieckie

Jabłoń-Uszyńskie [ˈjabwɔɲ uˈʂɨɲskʲɛ] is a village in the administrative district of Gmina Wysokie Mazowieckie, within Wysokie Mazowieckie County, Podlaskie Voivodeship, in north-eastern Poland.
