= Jabłonka-Świerczewo =

- Village
- Location within Poland
- Coordinates: 52°56′59″N 22°22′36″E
- Country: Poland
- Voivodeship: Podlaskie
- County: Wysokie Mazowieckie
- Gmina: Wysokie Mazowieckie
- Time zone: UTC+1 (CET)
  - Summer (DST): UTC+2 (CEST)

Jabłonka-Świerczewo (Polish pronunciation: [jaˈbwɔnka ɕfjɛrˈt͡ʂɛvɔ]) is a village in the administrative district of Gmina Wysokie Mazowieckie, within Wysokie Mazowieckie County, Podlaskie Voivodeship, in north-eastern Poland.

== History ==
Three Polish citizens were murdered by Nazi Germany in the village during World War II.
