= Stara Ruś =

- Village
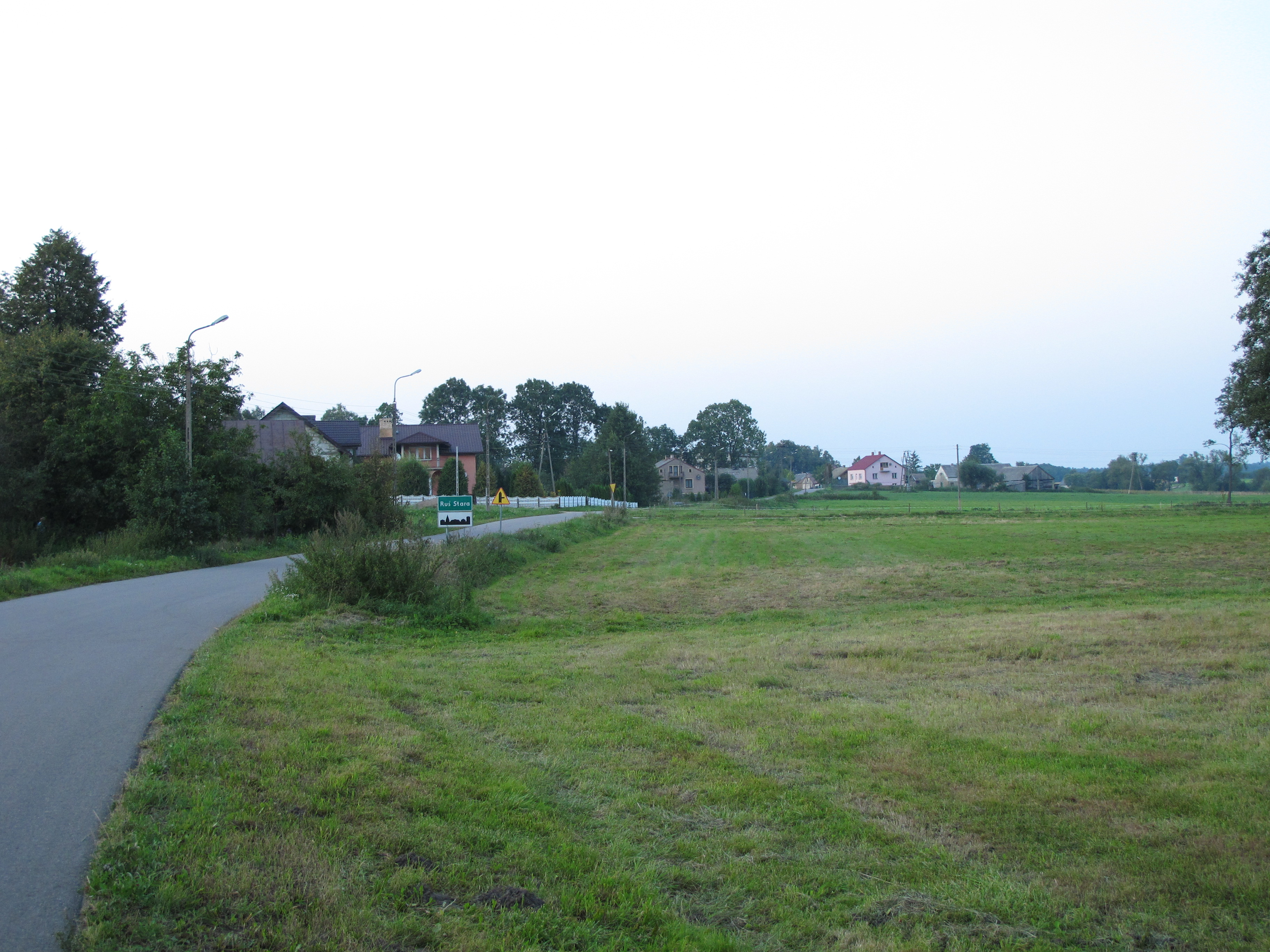
- Park in Stara Ruś

- Location within Poland
- Coordinates: 52°58′11″N 22°38′57″E
- Country: Poland
- Voivodeship: Podlaskie
- County: Wysokie Mazowieckie
- Gmina: Wysokie Mazowieckie

Stara Ruś [ˈstara ˈruɕ] is a village in the administrative district of Gmina Wysokie Mazowieckie, within Wysokie Mazowieckie County, Podlaskie Voivodeship, in north-eastern Poland.
