= Jabłonka Kościelna =

- Village
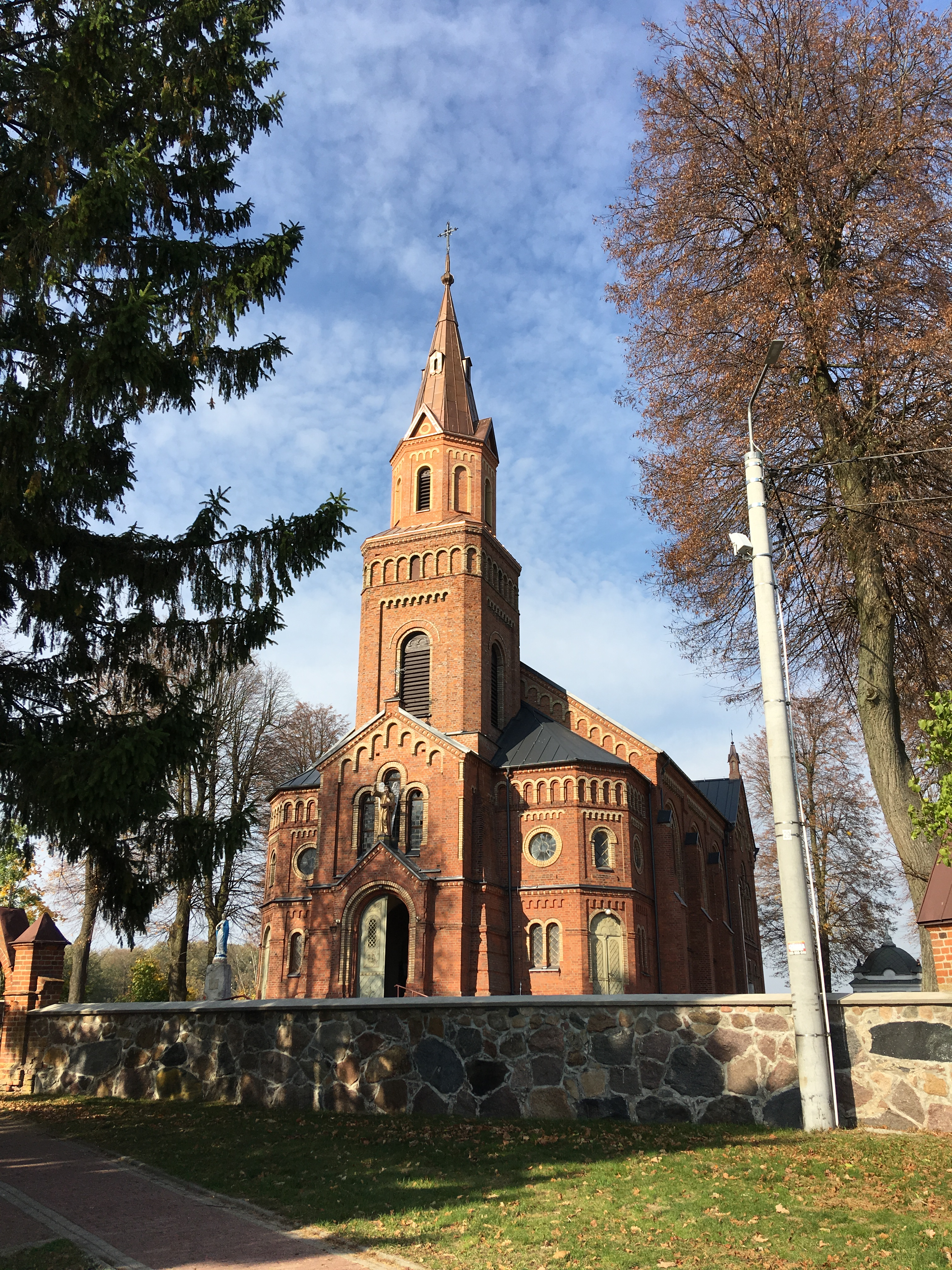
- Church of Saint Michael Archangel

- Location within Poland
- Coordinates: 52°57′N 22°22′E
- Country: Poland
- Voivodeship: Podlaskie
- County: Wysokie Mazowieckie
- Gmina: Wysokie Mazowieckie

Population
  - Total: 160

Jabłonka Kościelna [jaˈbwɔnka kɔɕˈt͡ɕɛlna] is a village in the administrative district of Gmina Wysokie Mazowieckie, within Wysokie Mazowieckie County, Podlaskie Voivodeship, in north-eastern Poland.
