= Dąbrowa-Dzięciel =

- Village
- Location within Poland
- Coordinates: 52°53′N 22°26′E
- Country: Poland
- Voivodeship: Podlaskie
- County: Wysokie Mazowieckie
- Gmina: Wysokie Mazowieckie

Dąbrowa-Dzięciel [dɔmˈbrɔva ˈd͡ʑɛnt͡ɕɛl] is a village in the administrative district of Gmina Wysokie Mazowieckie, within Wysokie Mazowieckie County, Podlaskie Voivodeship, in north-eastern Poland.
