= Wiśniówek, Podlaskie Voivodeship =

Wiśniówek
- Village
- Location within Poland
- Coordinates: 52°55′N 22°26′E
- Country: Poland
- Voivodeship: Podlaskie
- County: Wysokie Mazowieckie
- Gmina: Wysokie Mazowieckie

Wiśniówek [viɕˈɲuvɛk] is a village in the administrative district of Gmina Wysokie Mazowieckie, within Wysokie Mazowieckie County, Podlaskie Voivodeship, in north-eastern Poland.
