= Zawrocie-Nowiny =

- Village
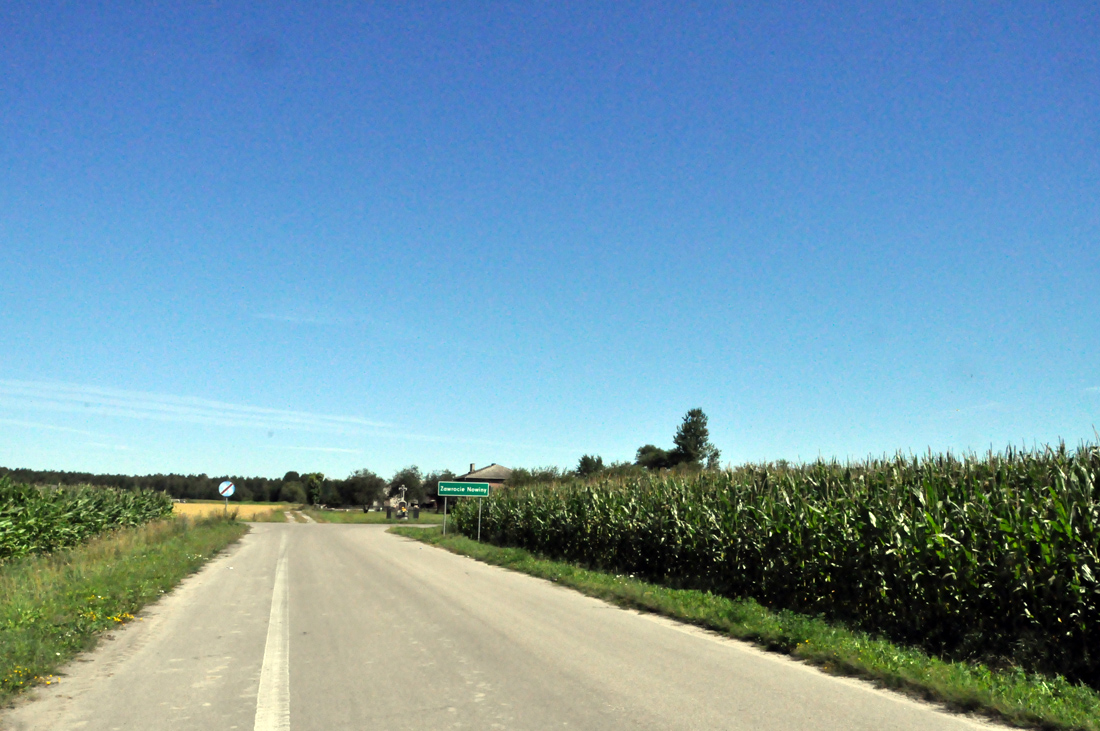
- Entrance to the village

- Location within Poland
- Coordinates: 52°56′20″N 22°32′22″E
- Country: Poland
- Voivodeship: Podlaskie
- County: Wysokie Mazowieckie
- Gmina: Wysokie Mazowieckie

Zawrocie-Nowiny [zaˈvrɔt͡ɕɛ nɔˈvinɨ] is a village in the administrative district of Gmina Wysokie Mazowieckie, within Wysokie Mazowieckie County, Podlaskie Voivodeship, in north-eastern Poland.
