= Faszcze, Gmina Wysokie Mazowieckie =

Faszcze
- Village
- Location within Poland
- Coordinates: 53°50′22″N 21°29′37″E
- Country: Poland
- Voivodeship: Podlaskie
- County: Wysokie Mazowieckie
- Gmina: Wysokie Mazowieckie

Faszcze [ˈfaʂt͡ʂɛ] is a village in the administrative district of Gmina Wysokie Mazowieckie, within Wysokie Mazowieckie County, Podlaskie Voivodeship, in north-eastern Poland.
