= Nowa Ruś =

- Village
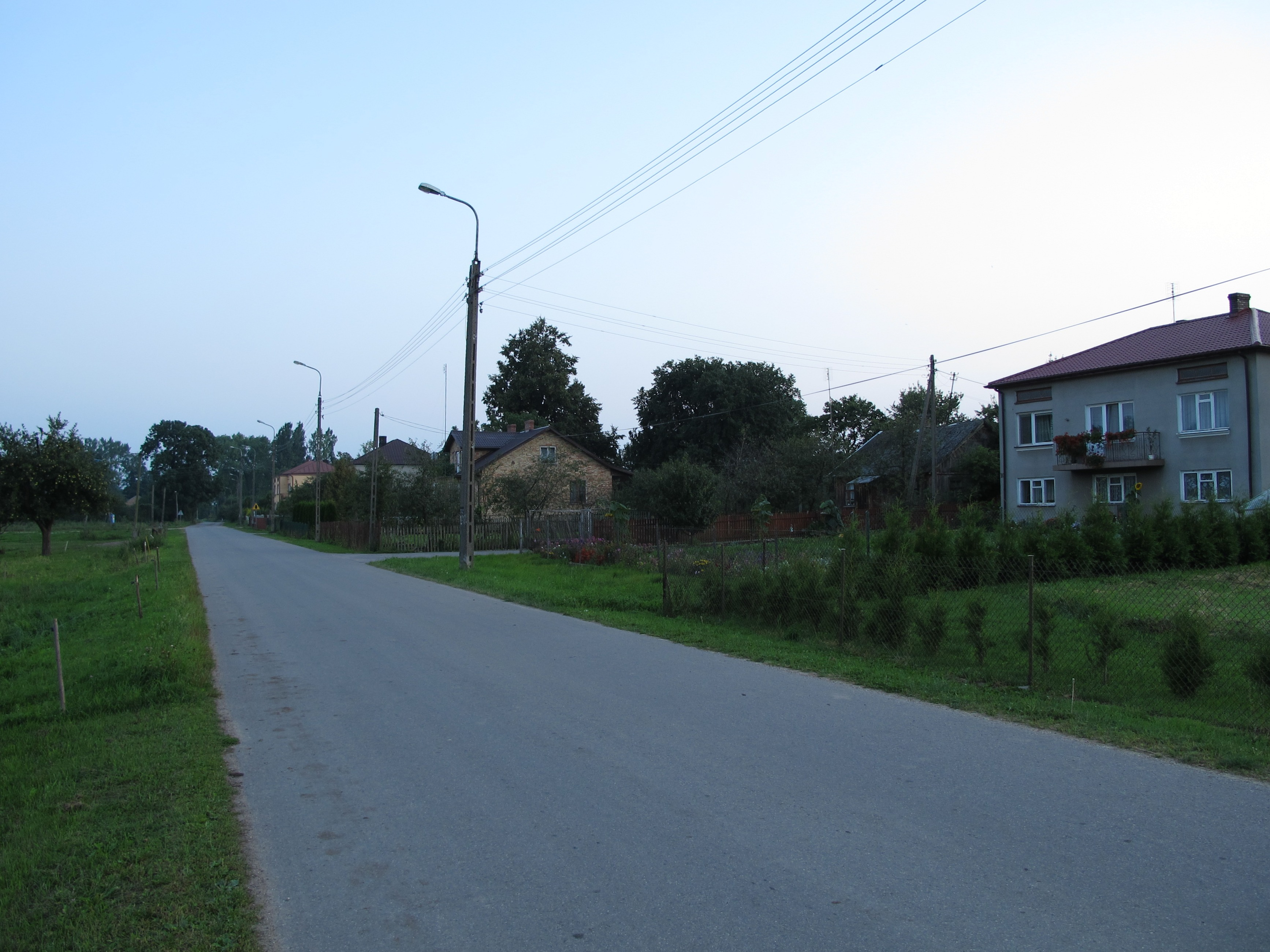
- Roadside houses in Nowa Ruś

- Location within Poland
- Coordinates: 52°57′43″N 22°38′40″E
- Country: Poland
- Voivodeship: Podlaskie
- County: Wysokie Mazowieckie
- Gmina: Wysokie Mazowieckie

Nowa Ruś [ˈnɔva ˈruɕ] is a village in the administrative district of Gmina Wysokie Mazowieckie, within Wysokie Mazowieckie County, Podlaskie Voivodeship, in north-eastern Poland.
