= Sokoły-Jaźwiny =

- Village
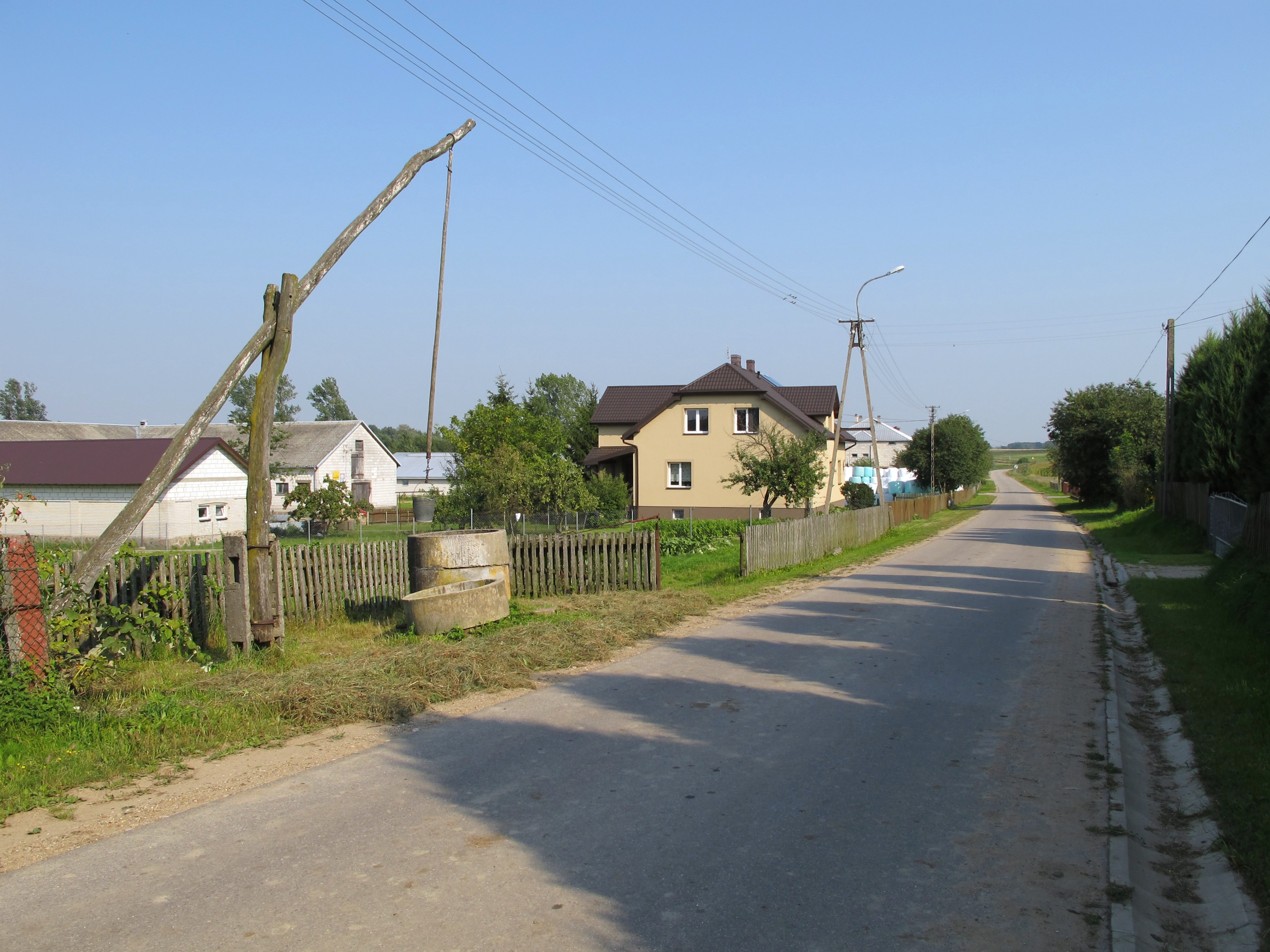

- Location within Poland
- Coordinates: 52°58′24″N 22°37′15″E
- Country: Poland
- Voivodeship: Podlaskie
- County: Wysokie Mazowieckie
- Gmina: Wysokie Mazowieckie

Sokoły-Jaźwiny [sɔˈkɔwɨ jaʑˈvinɨ] is a village in the administrative district of Gmina Wysokie Mazowieckie, within Wysokie Mazowieckie County, Podlaskie Voivodeship, in north-eastern Poland.
