= Miodusy-Stasiowięta =

Village in Gmina Wysokie Mazowieckie, Poland

- Village
- Location within Poland
- Coordinates: 52°56′10″N 22°22′07″E
- Country: Poland
- Voivodeship: Podlaskie
- County: Wysokie Mazowieckie
- Gmina: Wysokie Mazowieckie
- Postal code: 18-200
- Vehicle registration: BWM

Miodusy-Stasiowięta [mjɔˈdusɨ staɕɔˈvjɛnta] is a village in the administrative district of Gmina Wysokie Mazowieckie, within Wysokie Mazowieckie County, Podlaskie Voivodeship, in north-eastern Poland.
