= Gołasze-Górki =

Village in Gmina Wysokie Mazowieckie, Poland

- Village
- Location within Poland
- Coordinates: 52°58′00″N 22°27′51″E
- Country: Poland
- Voivodeship: Podlaskie
- County: Wysokie Mazowieckie
- Gmina: Wysokie Mazowieckie

Gołasze-Górki [ɡɔˈwaʂɛ ˈɡurki] is a village in the administrative district of Gmina Wysokie Mazowieckie, within Wysokie Mazowieckie County, Podlaskie Voivodeship, in north-eastern Poland.
