= Mazury, Podlaskie Voivodeship =

Mazury
- Village
- Location within Poland
- Coordinates: 52°57′N 22°37′E
- Country: Poland
- Voivodeship: Podlaskie
- County: Wysokie Mazowieckie
- Gmina: Wysokie Mazowieckie

Mazury [maˈzurɨ] is a village in the administrative district of Gmina Wysokie Mazowieckie, within Wysokie Mazowieckie County, Podlaskie Voivodeship, in north-eastern Poland.
