= Tybory-Kamianka =

- Village
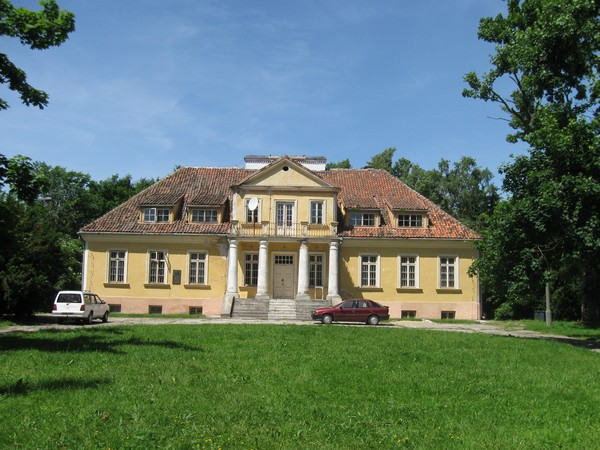
- Roszkowski Palace in Tybory-Kamianka

- Location within Poland
- Coordinates: 52°57′44″N 22°24′13″E
- Country: Poland
- Voivodeship: Podlaskie
- County: Wysokie Mazowieckie
- Gmina: Wysokie Mazowieckie
- Population: 120

Tybory-Kamianka [tɨˈbɔrɨ kaˈmjaŋka] is a village in the administrative district of the Gmina Wysokie Mazowieckie, within Wysokie Mazowieckie County, Podlaskie Voivodeship, in north-eastern Poland.

Polish historian and archaeologist Zygmunt Gloger was born here.
