= Gmina Wysokie Mazowieckie =

Gmina Wysokie Mazowieckie Wysokie Mazowieckie Commune
- Gmina
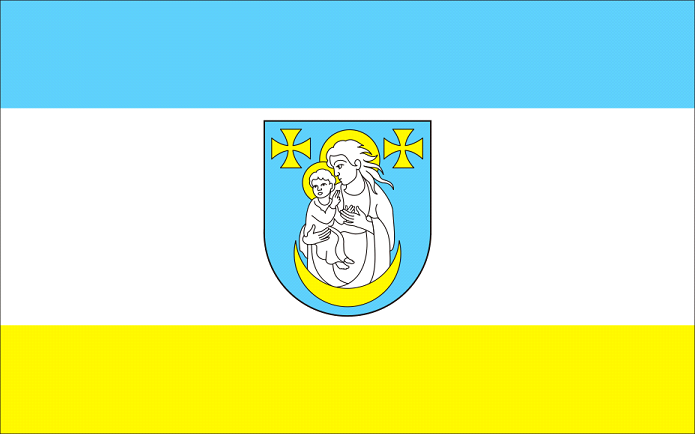
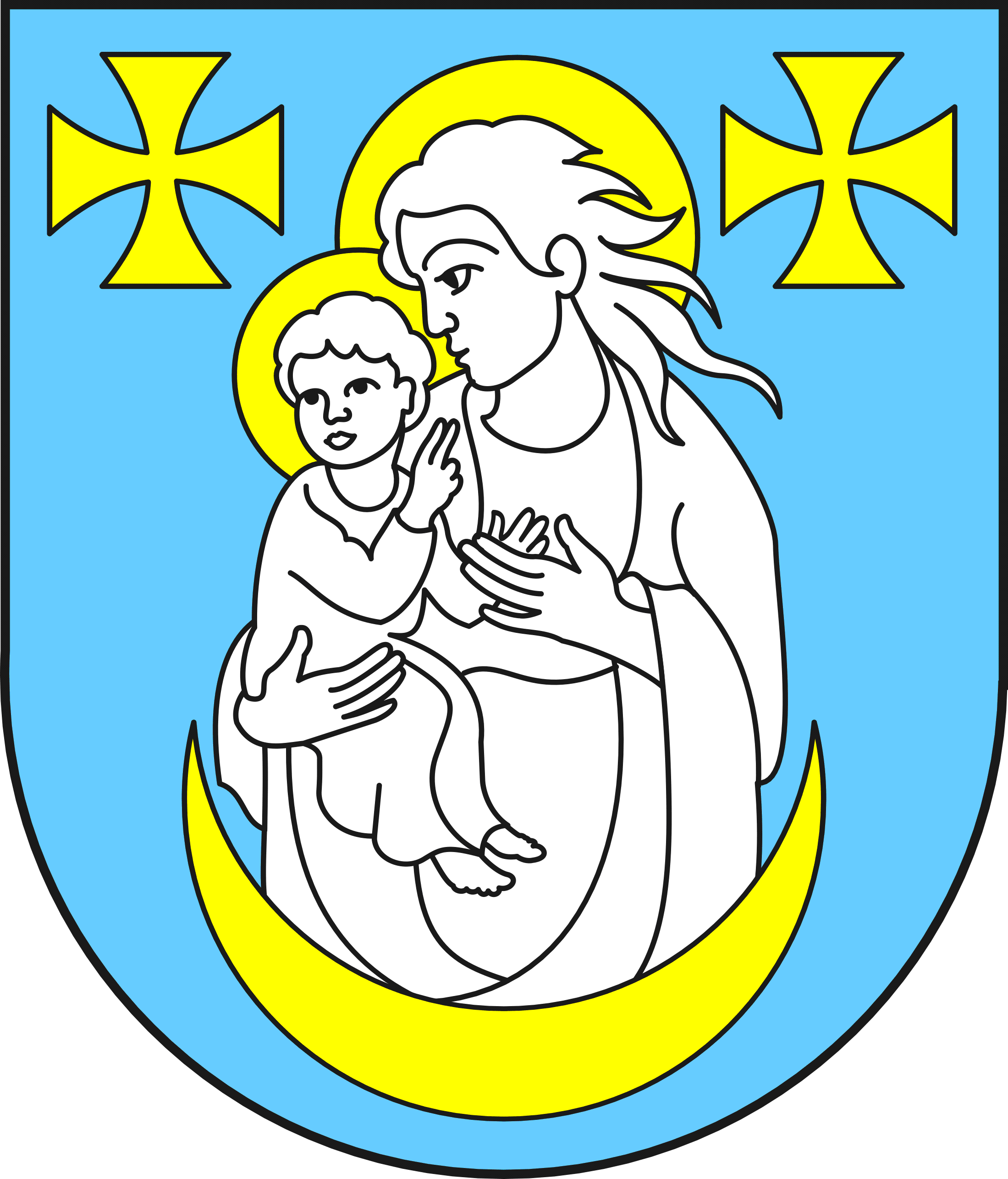
- Flag Coat of arms
- Interactive map of Gmina Wysokie Mazowieckie
- Coordinates (Wysokie Mazowieckie): 52°55′9″N 22°30′52″E
- Country: Poland
- Voivodeship: Podlaskie
- County: Wysokie Mazowieckie
- Seat: Wysokie Mazowieckie

Area
  - Total: 166.11 km^{2} (64.14 sq mi)

Population (2013)
  - Total: 5,377
  - Density: 32.37/km^{2} (83.84/sq mi)
- Website: http://www.gminawysokiemazowieckie.pl/

Gmina Wysokie Mazowieckie is a rural gmina (administrative district) in Wysokie Mazowieckie County, Podlaskie Voivodeship, in north-eastern Poland. Its seat is the town of Wysokie Mazowieckie, although the town is not part of the territory of the gmina.

The gmina covers an area of 166.11 square kilometres (64.1 sq mi), and as of 2006 its total population is 5,263 (5,377 in 2013).

== Villages ==
Gmina Wysokie Mazowieckie contains the villages and settlements of Brok, Bryki, Brzóski Brzezińskie, Brzóski-Falki, Brzóski-Gromki, Brzóski-Markowizna, Brzóski-Tatary, Buczyno-Mikosy, Bujny-Biszewo, Dąbrowa-Dzięciel, Faszcze, Gołasze-Górki, Gołasze-Puszcza, Jabłoń-Rykacze, Jabłoń-Uszyńskie, Jabłonka Kościelna, Jabłonka-Świerczewo, Kalinowo-Czosnowo, Mazury, Michałki, Miodusy Wielkie, Miodusy-Litwa, Miodusy-Stasiowięta, Miodusy-Stok, Mścichy, Mystki-Rzym, Nowa Ruś, Nowe Osipy, Osipy-Kolonia, Osipy-Lepertowizna, Osipy-Wydziory Drugie, Osipy-Wydziory Pierwsze, Osipy-Zakrzewizna, Rębiszewo-Studzianki, Sokoły-Jaźwiny, Stara Ruś, Stare Brzóski, Stare Osipy, Święck Wielki, Święck-Nowiny, Trzeciny, Tybory-Jeziernia, Tybory-Kamianka, Tybory-Misztale, Tybory-Olszewo, Tybory-Trzcianka, Tybory-Wólka, Tybory-Żochy, Wiśniówek, Wiśniówek-Kolonia, Wólka Duża, Wólka Mała, Wróble and Zawrocie-Nowiny.

== Neighbouring gminas ==
Gmina Wysokie Mazowieckie is bordered by the town of Wysokie Mazowieckie and by the gminas of Czyżew-Osada, Kołaki Kościelne, Kulesze Kościelne, Nowe Piekuty, Sokoły, Szepietowo and Zambrów.
