= Buczyno-Mikosy =

- Village
- Location within Poland
- Coordinates: 52°57′11″N 22°33′35″E
- Country: Poland
- Voivodeship: Podlaskie
- County: Wysokie Mazowieckie
- Gmina: Wysokie Mazowieckie

Buczyno-Mikosy [buˈt͡ʂɨnɔ miˈkɔsɨ] is a village in the administrative district of Gmina Wysokie Mazowieckie, within Wysokie Mazowieckie County, Podlaskie Voivodeship, in north-eastern Poland.
