= Mystki-Rzym =

- Village
- Location within Poland
- Coordinates: 52°53′45″N 22°31′03″E
- Country: Poland
- Voivodeship: Podlaskie
- County: Wysokie Mazowieckie
- Gmina: Wysokie Mazowieckie
- Postal Code: 18-200
- Area Code: (+48) 86
- Vehicle registration: BWM

Mystki-Rzym [ˈmɨstki ˈʐɨm] is a village in the administrative district of Gmina Wysokie Mazowieckie, within Wysokie Mazowieckie County, Podlaskie Voivodeship, in north-eastern Poland.
