= Święck Wielki =

- Village
- Location within Poland
- Coordinates: 52°53′N 22°25′E
- Country: Poland
- Voivodeship: Podlaskie
- County: Wysokie Mazowieckie
- Gmina: Wysokie Mazowieckie

Święck Wielki (Polish pronunciation: [ˈɕfjɛnt͡sk ˈfjɛlkʲi]) is a village in the administrative district of Gmina Wysokie Mazowieckie, within Wysokie Mazowieckie County, Podlaskie Voivodeship, in north-eastern Poland.
