= Miodusy-Stok =

- Village
- Location within Poland
- Coordinates: 52°54′56″N 22°21′0″E
- Country: Poland
- Voivodeship: Podlaskie
- County: Wysokie Mazowieckie
- Gmina: Wysokie Mazowieckie
- Postal code: 18-200
- Vehicle registration: BWM

Miodusy-Stok [mjɔˈdusɨ ˈstɔk] is a village in the administrative district of Gmina Wysokie Mazowieckie, within Wysokie Mazowieckie County, Podlaskie Voivodeship, in north-eastern Poland.
