= Mścichy, Wysokie Mazowieckie County =

Mścichy
- Village
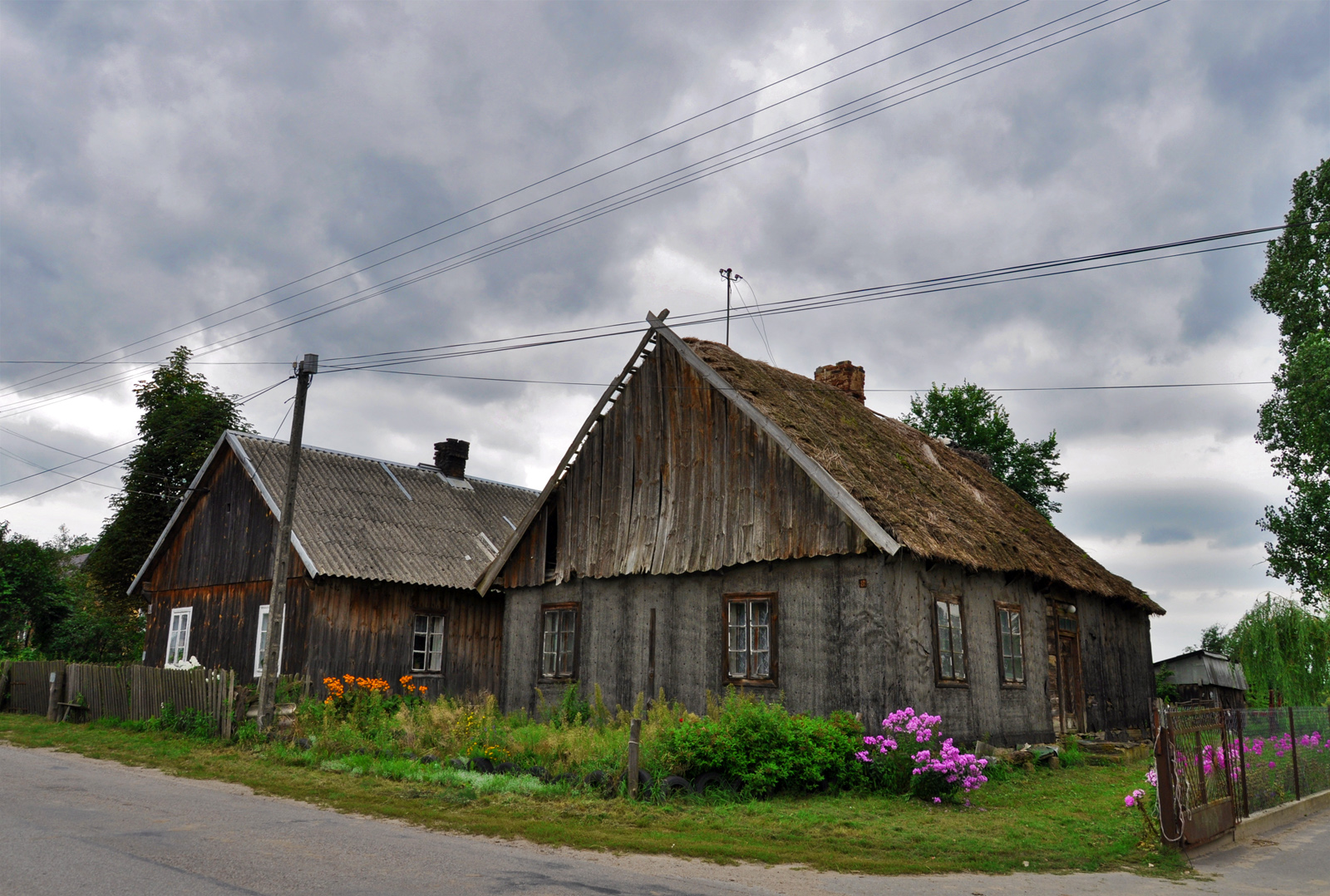
- Wooden houses in the village

- Location within Poland
- Coordinates: 52°54′N 22°28′E
- Country: Poland
- Voivodeship: Podlaskie
- County: Wysokie Mazowieckie
- Gmina: Wysokie Mazowieckie

Mścichy [ˈmɕt͡ɕixɨ] is a village in the administrative district of Gmina Wysokie Mazowieckie, within Wysokie Mazowieckie County, Podlaskie Voivodeship, in north-eastern Poland.

== Gallery ==
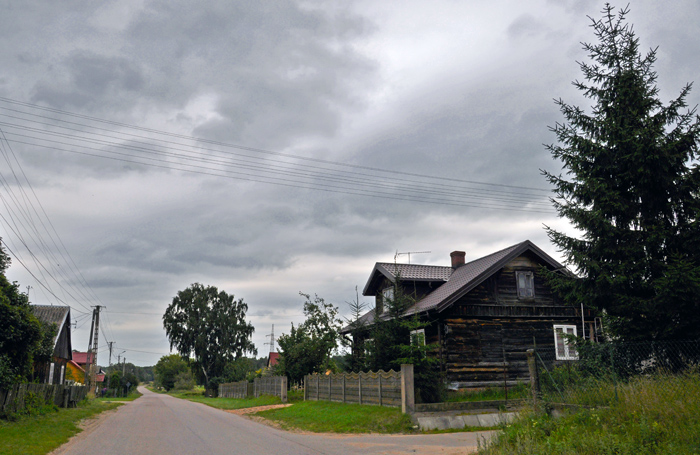

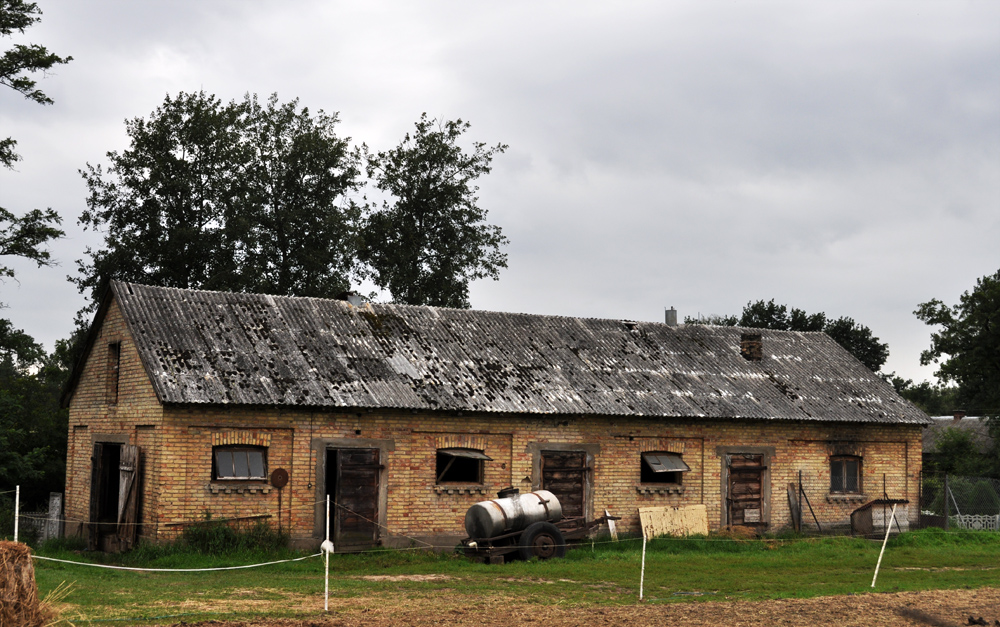

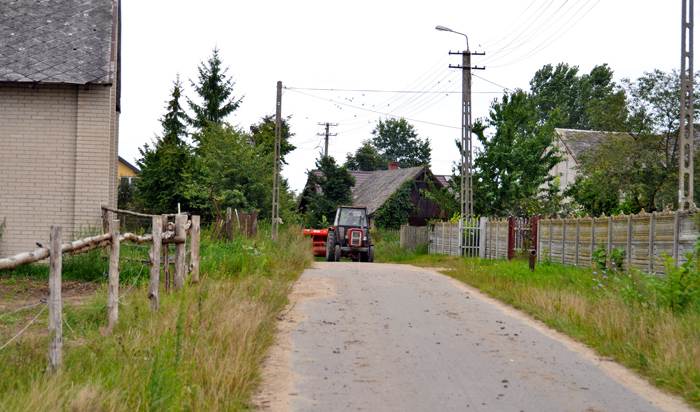

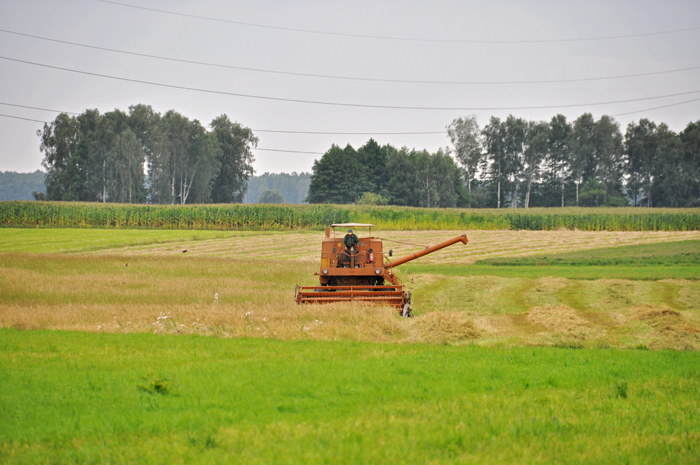
