= Kalinowo-Czosnowo =

- Village
- Location within Poland
- Coordinates: 52°58′N 22°33′E
- Country: Poland
- Voivodeship: Podlaskie
- County: Wysokie Mazowieckie
- Gmina: Wysokie Mazowieckie
- Population: 110

Kalinowo-Czosnowo [kaliˈnɔvɔ t͡ʂɔsˈnɔvɔ] is a village in the administrative district of Gmina Wysokie Mazowieckie, within Wysokie Mazowieckie County, Podlaskie Voivodeship, in north-eastern Poland.
