= Litva, Brest region =

Village in Brest Region, Belarus

Litva Літва (Belarusian)
- Village
- Location within Belarus
- Coordinates: 53°06′0″N 26°09′0″E
- Country: Belarus
- Region: Brest Region
- District: Lyakhavichy District
- Time zone: UTC+3 (MSK)

Litva (Belarusian: Літва; Russian: Литва; Polish: Litwa) is a village in Lyakhavichy District, Brest Region, Belarus. It is part of Konki selsoviet. It is located 120 kilometres (75 mi) south-west of the capital Minsk.
