= Brzóski-Tatary =

- Village
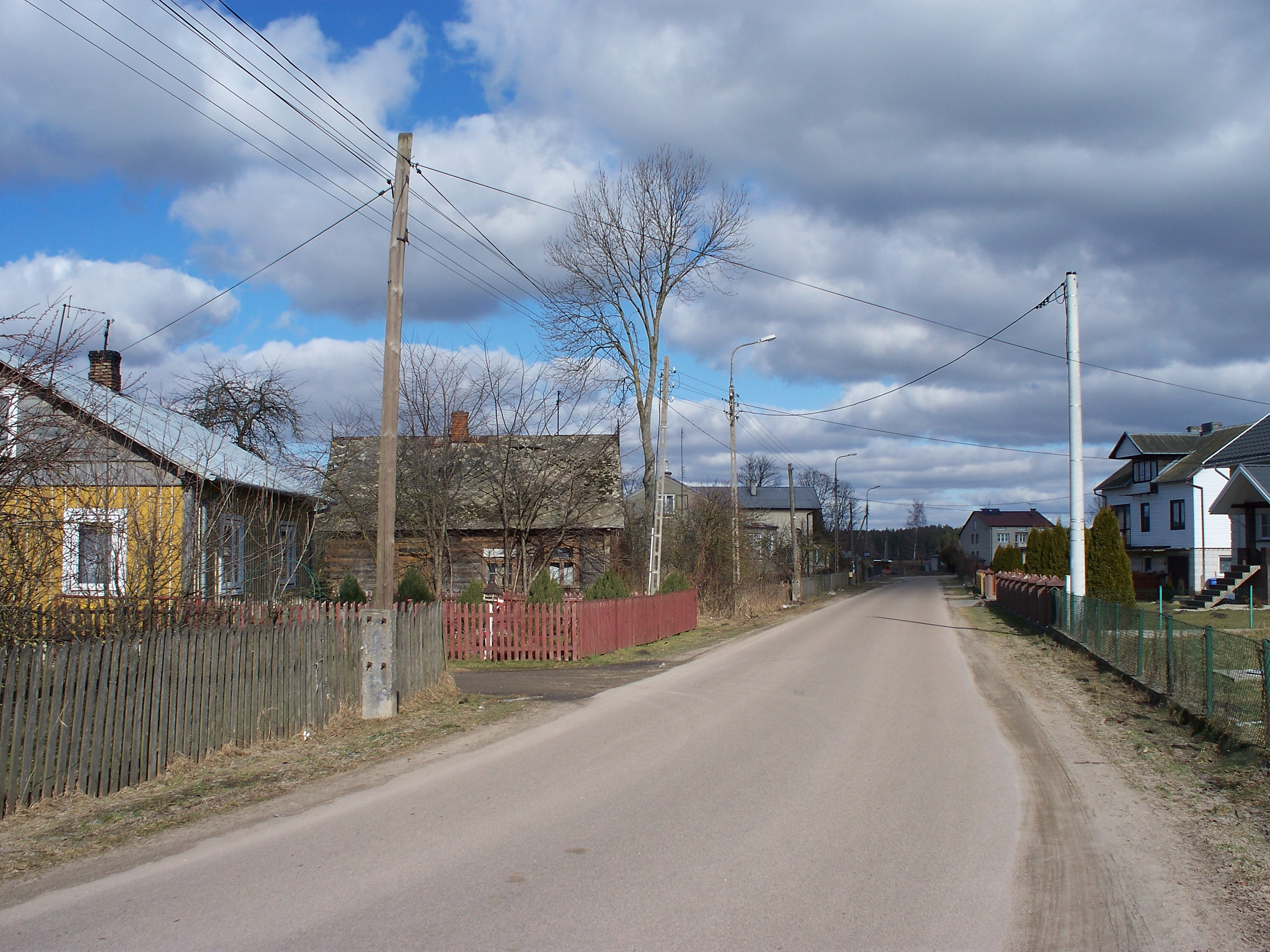

- Location within Poland
- Coordinates: 52°54′49″N 22°35′15″E
- Country: Poland
- Voivodeship: Podlaskie
- County: Wysokie Mazowieckie
- Gmina: Wysokie Mazowieckie

Brzóski-Tatary [ˈbʐuski taˈtarɨ] is a village in the administrative district of Gmina Wysokie Mazowieckie, within Wysokie Mazowieckie County, Podlaskie Voivodeship, in north-eastern Poland.
