= Osipy-Wydziory Drugie =

- Village
- Location within Poland
- Coordinates: 52°56′48″N 22°27′15″E
- Country: Poland
- Voivodeship: Podlaskie
- County: Wysokie Mazowieckie
- Gmina: Wysokie Mazowieckie

Osipy-Wydziory Drugie [ɔˈɕipɨ vɨˈd͡ʑɔrɨ ˈdruɡʲɛ] is a village in the administrative district of Gmina Wysokie Mazowieckie, within Wysokie Mazowieckie County, Podlaskie Voivodeship, in north-eastern Poland.
