= Osipy-Kolonia =

- Village
- Location within Poland
- Coordinates: 52°55′57″N 22°27′55″E
- Country: Poland
- Voivodeship: Podlaskie
- County: Wysokie Mazowieckie
- Gmina: Wysokie Mazowieckie

Osipy-Kolonia [ɔˈɕipɨ kɔˈlɔɲa] is a village in the administrative district of Gmina Wysokie Mazowieckie, within Wysokie Mazowieckie County, Podlaskie Voivodeship, in north-eastern Poland.
