= Brzóski-Gromki =

- Village
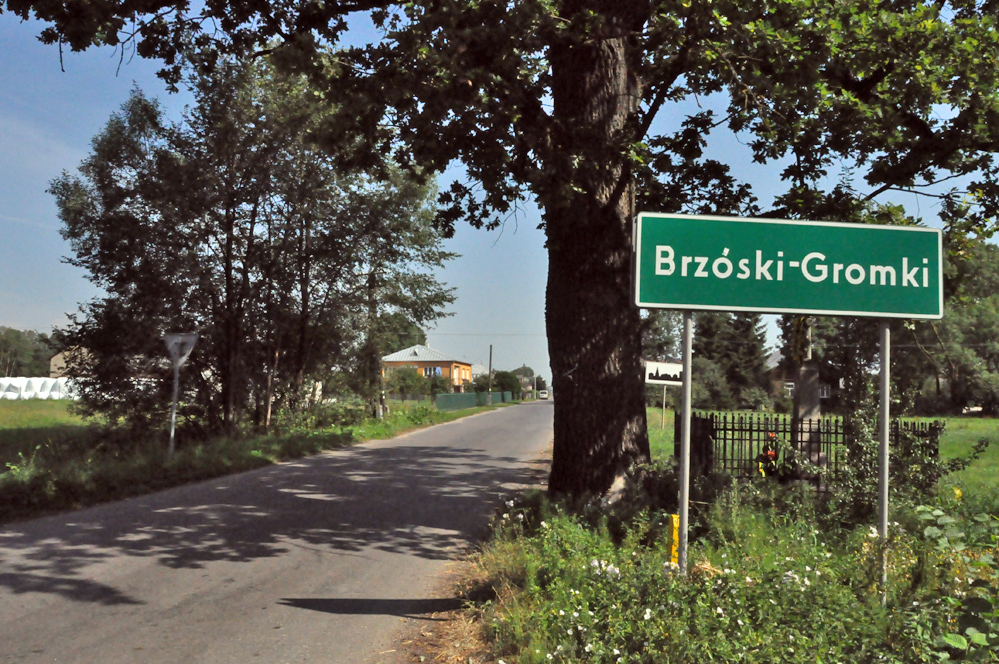
- Entrance to the village

- Location within Poland
- Coordinates: 52°55′53″N 22°33′05″E
- Country: Poland
- Voivodeship: Podlaskie
- County: Wysokie Mazowieckie
- Gmina: Wysokie Mazowieckie

Brzóski-Gromki [ˈbʐuski ˈɡrɔmki] is a village in the administrative district of Gmina Wysokie Mazowieckie, within Wysokie Mazowieckie County, Podlaskie Voivodeship, in north-eastern Poland.
