= Zygmunt Gloger =

Polish historian, archaeologist and geographer

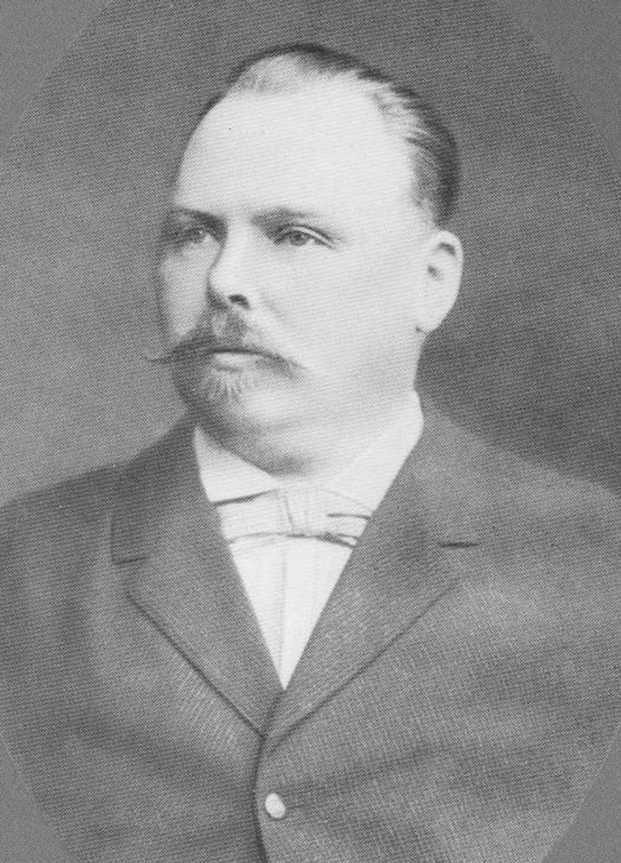
- Born: 3 November 1845; Tybory-Kamianka, Congress Poland
- Died: 16 August 1910 (aged 64); Warsaw, Congress Poland
- Occupations: Historian, archaeologist, geographer
- Writing career
- Genres: Ethnography, history, personal correspondence
- Notable work: Encyklopedia staropolska ilustrowana (1900-03)
- Movement: Modernism

Zygmunt Gloger (3 November 1845 – 16 August 1910) was a Polish historian, archaeologist, geographer and ethnographer, bearer of the Wilczekosy coat of arms. Gloger founded the precursor of modern and widely popular Polish Tourist and Sightseeing Society (PTTK).

== Life ==
He was a son of engineer Jan Gloger and Michalina née Wojno. Under the professional influence of historians and geographers Julian Bartoszewicz as well as Józef Ignacy Krasicki, and later Wincenty Pol and Oskar Kolberg, Gloger voyaged through Poland and Lithuania under the foreign Partitions, and corresponded with many European scholars.

Founder of Towarzystwo Krajoznawcze (the Sightseeing Society, precursor of modern PTTK), in his will Gloger gave his impressive collection to that organization as well as to the Towarzystwo Ethnograficzne (the Ethnographic Society), Towarzystwo Bibliotek Publicznych w Warszawie (Public Libraries Society) and Museum of Industry and Agriculture.

His life's work was the Encyklopedia staropolska ilustrowana (1900-1903), still considered a useful and important book about culture of Polish–Lithuanian Commonwealth. His other works include Obchody weselne (1869), Pieśni ludu (1892), Księga rzeczy polskich (1896), Rok polski w życiu, tradycji i pieśni (1900).

== Works ==
- Zygmunt Gloger (1900). Geografia historyczna ziem dawnej Polski (in Polish). Kraków: Spółka Wydawnicza Polska. ISBN 83-214-0883-4. Archived from the original on 2009-09-19.
- "Encyklopedia staropolska", Zygmunt Gloger, 1900-1903, online
- "Dolinami rzek. Opisy podróży wzdłuż Niemna, Wisły, Bugu i Biebrzy" Zygmunt Gloger, 1903, online

== See also ==
- List of Poles
