= Osipy-Zakrzewizna =

- Village
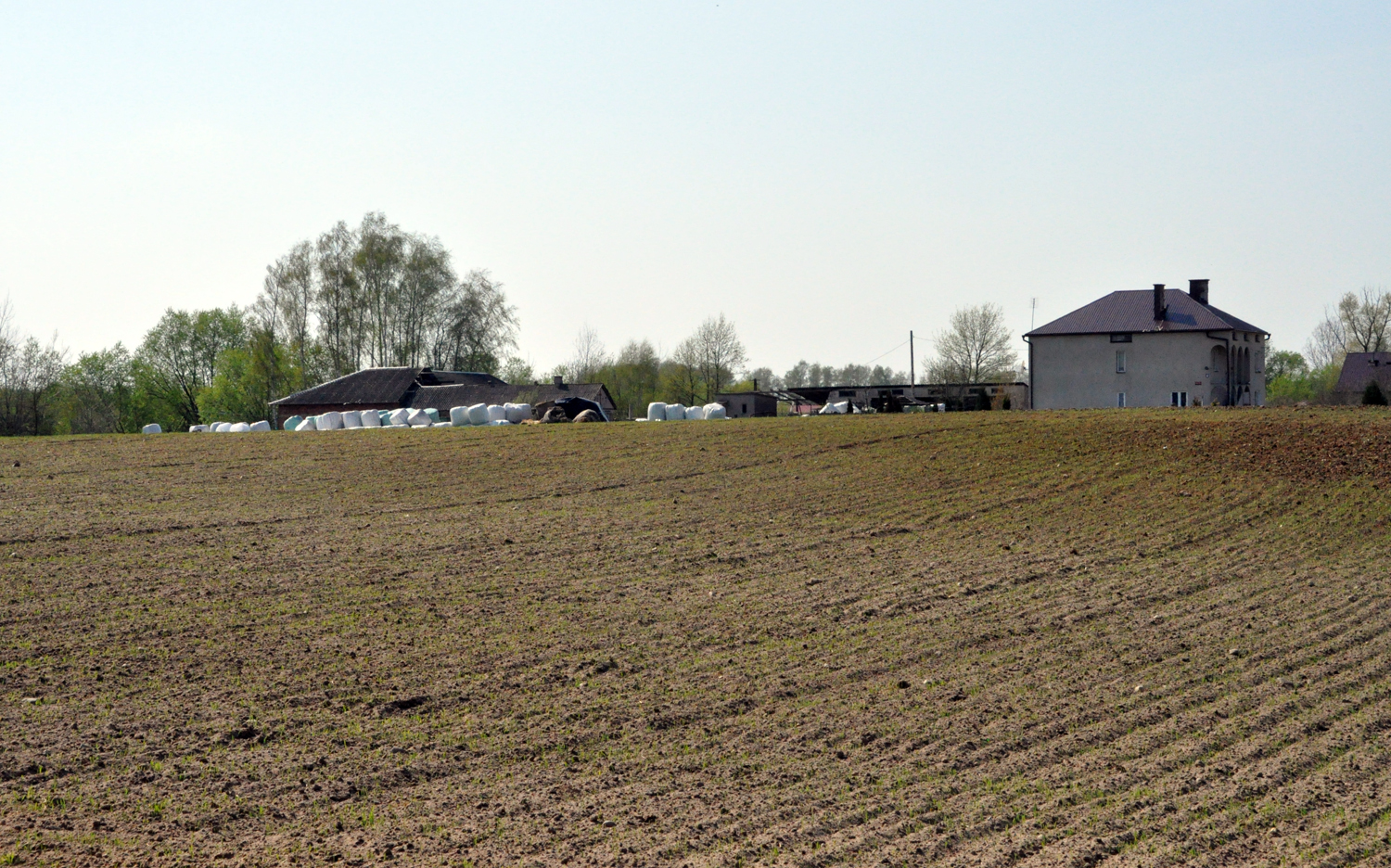
- View of the village

- Location within Poland
- Coordinates: 52°55′38″N 22°28′26″E
- Country: Poland
- Voivodeship: Podlaskie
- County: Wysokie Mazowieckie
- Gmina: Wysokie Mazowieckie

Osipy-Zakrzewizna [ɔˈɕipɨ zakʂɛˈvizna] is a village in the administrative district of Gmina Wysokie Mazowieckie, within Wysokie Mazowieckie County, Podlaskie Voivodeship, in north-eastern Poland.
