= Brzóski-Markowizna =

- Village
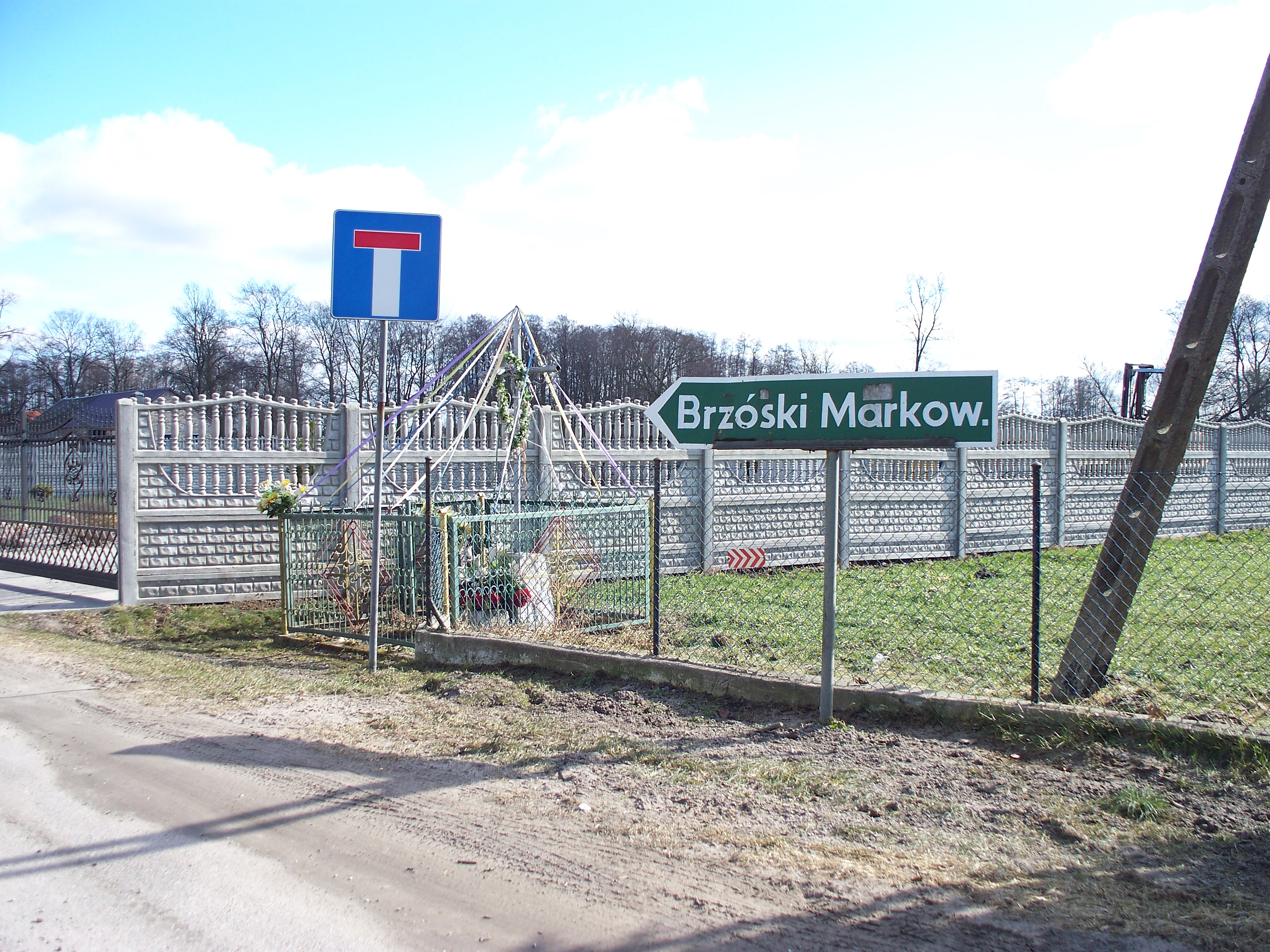
- Road sign to Brzóski-Markowizna

- Location within Poland
- Coordinates: 52°54′15″N 22°33′10″E
- Country: Poland
- Voivodeship: Podlaskie
- County: Wysokie Mazowieckie
- Gmina: Wysokie Mazowieckie

Brzóski-Markowizna [ˈbʐuski markɔˈvizna] is a village in the administrative district of Gmina Wysokie Mazowieckie, within Wysokie Mazowieckie County, Podlaskie Voivodeship, in north-eastern Poland.
