= Brzóski-Falki =

- Village
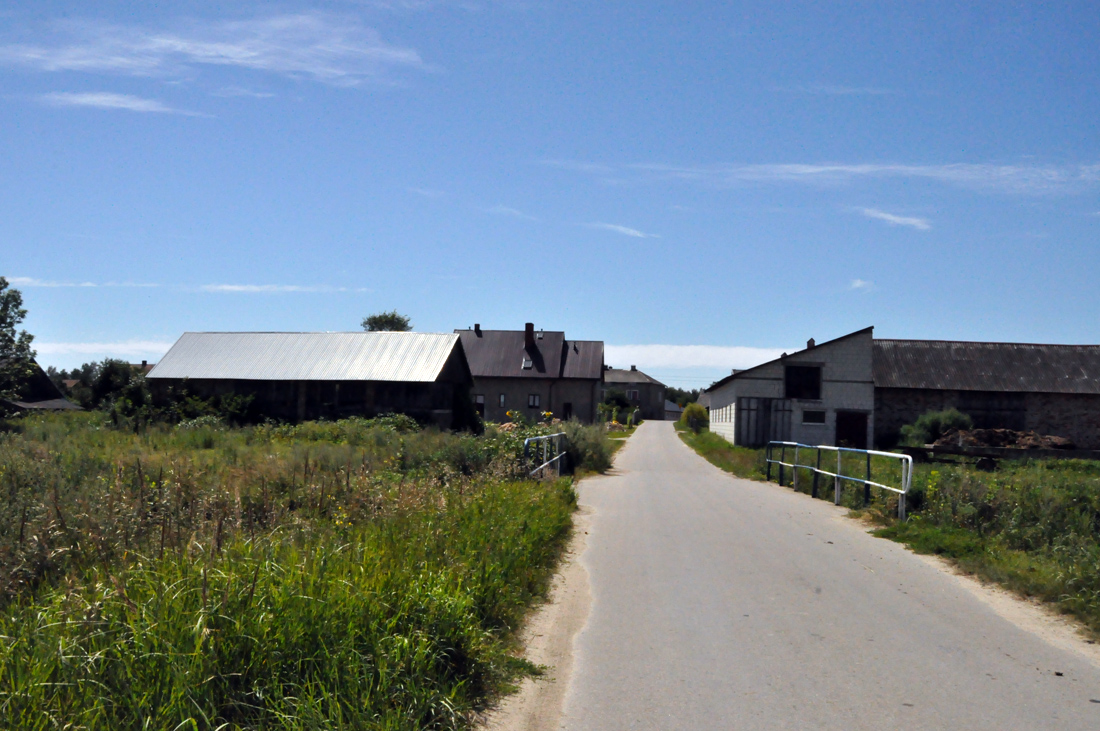
- View of the village

- Location within Poland
- Coordinates: 52°55′N 22°32′E
- Country: Poland
- Voivodeship: Podlaskie
- County: Wysokie Mazowieckie
- Gmina: Wysokie Mazowieckie

Brzóski-Falki [ˈbʐuski ˈfalki] is a village in the administrative district of Gmina Wysokie Mazowieckie, within Wysokie Mazowieckie County, Podlaskie Voivodeship, in north-eastern Poland.
