= Osipy-Wydziory Pierwsze =

- Village
- Location within Poland
- Coordinates: 52°55′33″N 22°27′15″E
- Country: Poland
- Voivodeship: Podlaskie
- County: Wysokie Mazowieckie
- Gmina: Wysokie Mazowieckie

Osipy-Wydziory Pierwsze [ɔˈɕipɨ vɨˈd͡ʑɔrɨ ˈpjɛrfʂɛ] is a village in the administrative district of Gmina Wysokie Mazowieckie, within Wysokie Mazowieckie County, Podlaskie Voivodeship, in north-eastern Poland.
