= Litva, Kursk Oblast =

Rural locality in Kursk Oblast, Russia

Litva Литва
- Khutor
- Interactive map of Litva
- Location of Litva Litva (Kursk Oblast)
- Coordinates: 51°56′55″N 35°49′14″E
- Country: Russia
- Federal subject: Kursk Oblast
- Administrative district: Fatezhsky District
- SelsovietSelsoviet: Bolshezhirovsky

Population (2010 Census)
  - Total: 7
  - Estimate (2010): 7 (0%)

Municipal status
  - Municipal district: Fatezhsky Municipal District
  - Rural settlement: Bolshezhirovsky Selsoviet Rural Settlement
- Time zone: UTC+3 (MSK)
- Postal code: 307114
- Dialing code: +7 47144
- OKTMO ID: 38644412316
- Website: мобольшежировский.рф

Litva (Russian: Литва) is a rural locality (a khutor) in Bolshezhirovsky Selsoviet Rural Settlement, Fatezhsky District, Kursk Oblast, Russia. Population: 7 (2010 census); 14 (2002 census);

== Geography ==
The khutor is located in the Nikovets River basin (a right tributary of the Ruda in the basin of the Svapa), 93 km from the Russia–Ukraine border, 35 km north-west of Kursk, 15.5 km south-west of the district center – the town Fatezh, 10.5 km from the selsoviet center – Bolshoye Zhirovo.

Climate

Litva has a warm summer humid continental climate (Dfb in the Köppen climate classification).
