= Miodusy-Litwa =

- Village
- Location within Poland
- Coordinates: 52°56′07″N 22°23′26″E
- Country: Poland
- Voivodeship: Podlaskie
- County: Wysokie Mazowieckie
- Gmina: Wysokie Mazowieckie
- Postal code: 18-200
- Vehicle registration: BWM

Miodusy-Litwa [mjɔˈdusɨ ˈlitfa] is a village in the administrative district of Gmina Wysokie Mazowieckie, within Wysokie Mazowieckie County, Podlaskie Voivodeship, in north-eastern Poland.

Five Polish citizens were murdered by Nazi Germany in the village during World War II.
